

107001–107100 

|-bgcolor=#fefefe
| 107001 ||  || — || December 30, 2000 || Socorro || LINEAR || NYS || align=right | 1.1 km || 
|-id=002 bgcolor=#fefefe
| 107002 ||  || — || December 30, 2000 || Socorro || LINEAR || V || align=right | 1.4 km || 
|-id=003 bgcolor=#fefefe
| 107003 ||  || — || December 30, 2000 || Socorro || LINEAR || — || align=right | 1.2 km || 
|-id=004 bgcolor=#C2FFFF
| 107004 ||  || — || December 30, 2000 || Socorro || LINEAR || L4 || align=right | 17 km || 
|-id=005 bgcolor=#fefefe
| 107005 ||  || — || December 30, 2000 || Socorro || LINEAR || — || align=right | 1.4 km || 
|-id=006 bgcolor=#fefefe
| 107006 ||  || — || December 30, 2000 || Socorro || LINEAR || — || align=right | 1.2 km || 
|-id=007 bgcolor=#E9E9E9
| 107007 ||  || — || December 30, 2000 || Socorro || LINEAR || ADE || align=right | 7.0 km || 
|-id=008 bgcolor=#fefefe
| 107008 ||  || — || December 30, 2000 || Socorro || LINEAR || — || align=right | 1.4 km || 
|-id=009 bgcolor=#fefefe
| 107009 ||  || — || December 30, 2000 || Socorro || LINEAR || NYS || align=right | 3.1 km || 
|-id=010 bgcolor=#E9E9E9
| 107010 ||  || — || December 30, 2000 || Socorro || LINEAR || — || align=right | 4.2 km || 
|-id=011 bgcolor=#d6d6d6
| 107011 ||  || — || December 30, 2000 || Socorro || LINEAR || HYG || align=right | 4.6 km || 
|-id=012 bgcolor=#fefefe
| 107012 ||  || — || December 30, 2000 || Socorro || LINEAR || NYS || align=right | 1.3 km || 
|-id=013 bgcolor=#E9E9E9
| 107013 ||  || — || December 30, 2000 || Socorro || LINEAR || — || align=right | 4.2 km || 
|-id=014 bgcolor=#fefefe
| 107014 ||  || — || December 30, 2000 || Socorro || LINEAR || — || align=right | 1.3 km || 
|-id=015 bgcolor=#fefefe
| 107015 ||  || — || December 30, 2000 || Socorro || LINEAR || — || align=right | 1.2 km || 
|-id=016 bgcolor=#fefefe
| 107016 ||  || — || December 30, 2000 || Socorro || LINEAR || MAS || align=right | 1.6 km || 
|-id=017 bgcolor=#fefefe
| 107017 ||  || — || December 30, 2000 || Socorro || LINEAR || NYS || align=right | 1.7 km || 
|-id=018 bgcolor=#fefefe
| 107018 ||  || — || December 30, 2000 || Socorro || LINEAR || NYS || align=right | 1.4 km || 
|-id=019 bgcolor=#fefefe
| 107019 ||  || — || December 30, 2000 || Socorro || LINEAR || NYS || align=right | 1.7 km || 
|-id=020 bgcolor=#fefefe
| 107020 ||  || — || December 30, 2000 || Socorro || LINEAR || NYS || align=right | 1.9 km || 
|-id=021 bgcolor=#fefefe
| 107021 ||  || — || December 30, 2000 || Socorro || LINEAR || NYS || align=right | 1.5 km || 
|-id=022 bgcolor=#E9E9E9
| 107022 ||  || — || December 30, 2000 || Socorro || LINEAR || — || align=right | 3.8 km || 
|-id=023 bgcolor=#fefefe
| 107023 ||  || — || December 30, 2000 || Socorro || LINEAR || — || align=right | 2.2 km || 
|-id=024 bgcolor=#E9E9E9
| 107024 ||  || — || December 30, 2000 || Socorro || LINEAR || RAF || align=right | 2.8 km || 
|-id=025 bgcolor=#fefefe
| 107025 ||  || — || December 30, 2000 || Socorro || LINEAR || V || align=right | 1.5 km || 
|-id=026 bgcolor=#fefefe
| 107026 ||  || — || December 28, 2000 || Socorro || LINEAR || V || align=right | 1.3 km || 
|-id=027 bgcolor=#fefefe
| 107027 ||  || — || December 29, 2000 || Anderson Mesa || LONEOS || — || align=right | 2.6 km || 
|-id=028 bgcolor=#E9E9E9
| 107028 ||  || — || December 21, 2000 || Socorro || LINEAR || — || align=right | 2.6 km || 
|-id=029 bgcolor=#d6d6d6
| 107029 ||  || — || December 22, 2000 || Socorro || LINEAR || EUP || align=right | 9.3 km || 
|-id=030 bgcolor=#d6d6d6
| 107030 ||  || — || December 22, 2000 || Anderson Mesa || LONEOS || — || align=right | 5.3 km || 
|-id=031 bgcolor=#fefefe
| 107031 ||  || — || December 28, 2000 || Kitt Peak || Spacewatch || NYS || align=right | 1.6 km || 
|-id=032 bgcolor=#fefefe
| 107032 ||  || — || December 29, 2000 || Anderson Mesa || LONEOS || CIM || align=right | 4.6 km || 
|-id=033 bgcolor=#fefefe
| 107033 ||  || — || December 29, 2000 || Anderson Mesa || LONEOS || — || align=right | 2.1 km || 
|-id=034 bgcolor=#E9E9E9
| 107034 ||  || — || December 29, 2000 || Anderson Mesa || LONEOS || KON || align=right | 3.6 km || 
|-id=035 bgcolor=#E9E9E9
| 107035 ||  || — || December 29, 2000 || Anderson Mesa || LONEOS || — || align=right | 2.0 km || 
|-id=036 bgcolor=#fefefe
| 107036 ||  || — || December 29, 2000 || Anderson Mesa || LONEOS || V || align=right | 1.5 km || 
|-id=037 bgcolor=#E9E9E9
| 107037 ||  || — || December 29, 2000 || Anderson Mesa || LONEOS || — || align=right | 3.1 km || 
|-id=038 bgcolor=#E9E9E9
| 107038 ||  || — || December 29, 2000 || Haleakala || NEAT || — || align=right | 1.9 km || 
|-id=039 bgcolor=#E9E9E9
| 107039 ||  || — || December 29, 2000 || Haleakala || NEAT || — || align=right | 1.8 km || 
|-id=040 bgcolor=#fefefe
| 107040 ||  || — || December 29, 2000 || Haleakala || NEAT || — || align=right | 1.6 km || 
|-id=041 bgcolor=#E9E9E9
| 107041 ||  || — || December 29, 2000 || Haleakala || NEAT || — || align=right | 2.0 km || 
|-id=042 bgcolor=#E9E9E9
| 107042 ||  || — || December 29, 2000 || Haleakala || NEAT || EUN || align=right | 1.8 km || 
|-id=043 bgcolor=#fefefe
| 107043 ||  || — || December 29, 2000 || Haleakala || NEAT || FLO || align=right | 1.7 km || 
|-id=044 bgcolor=#fefefe
| 107044 ||  || — || December 30, 2000 || Socorro || LINEAR || NYS || align=right | 1.1 km || 
|-id=045 bgcolor=#fefefe
| 107045 ||  || — || December 31, 2000 || Kitt Peak || Spacewatch || — || align=right | 1.4 km || 
|-id=046 bgcolor=#fefefe
| 107046 ||  || — || December 22, 2000 || Kitt Peak || Spacewatch || — || align=right | 1.4 km || 
|-id=047 bgcolor=#fefefe
| 107047 ||  || — || December 26, 2000 || Kitt Peak || Spacewatch || NYS || align=right | 1.5 km || 
|-id=048 bgcolor=#fefefe
| 107048 ||  || — || December 26, 2000 || Kitt Peak || Spacewatch || FLO || align=right | 1.3 km || 
|-id=049 bgcolor=#E9E9E9
| 107049 ||  || — || December 31, 2000 || Anderson Mesa || LONEOS || — || align=right | 2.6 km || 
|-id=050 bgcolor=#E9E9E9
| 107050 ||  || — || December 28, 2000 || Socorro || LINEAR || — || align=right | 3.8 km || 
|-id=051 bgcolor=#fefefe
| 107051 || 2001 AD || — || January 1, 2001 || Kitt Peak || Spacewatch || — || align=right data-sort-value="0.97" | 970 m || 
|-id=052 bgcolor=#fefefe
| 107052 Aquincum || 2001 AQ ||  || January 1, 2001 || Piszkéstető || K. Sárneczky, L. Kiss || — || align=right | 1.2 km || 
|-id=053 bgcolor=#fefefe
| 107053 ||  || — || January 3, 2001 || Desert Beaver || W. K. Y. Yeung || FLO || align=right | 1.8 km || 
|-id=054 bgcolor=#fefefe
| 107054 Daniela ||  ||  || January 1, 2001 || Ondřejov || P. Kušnirák || FLO || align=right | 1.5 km || 
|-id=055 bgcolor=#fefefe
| 107055 ||  || — || January 3, 2001 || Kitt Peak || Spacewatch || V || align=right | 1.2 km || 
|-id=056 bgcolor=#fefefe
| 107056 ||  || — || January 2, 2001 || Socorro || LINEAR || — || align=right | 2.1 km || 
|-id=057 bgcolor=#fefefe
| 107057 ||  || — || January 2, 2001 || Socorro || LINEAR || — || align=right | 1.7 km || 
|-id=058 bgcolor=#fefefe
| 107058 ||  || — || January 2, 2001 || Socorro || LINEAR || NYS || align=right data-sort-value="0.95" | 950 m || 
|-id=059 bgcolor=#fefefe
| 107059 ||  || — || January 2, 2001 || Socorro || LINEAR || — || align=right | 1.6 km || 
|-id=060 bgcolor=#fefefe
| 107060 ||  || — || January 2, 2001 || Socorro || LINEAR || — || align=right | 1.6 km || 
|-id=061 bgcolor=#fefefe
| 107061 ||  || — || January 2, 2001 || Socorro || LINEAR || ERI || align=right | 2.9 km || 
|-id=062 bgcolor=#fefefe
| 107062 ||  || — || January 2, 2001 || Socorro || LINEAR || — || align=right | 1.7 km || 
|-id=063 bgcolor=#fefefe
| 107063 ||  || — || January 2, 2001 || Socorro || LINEAR || — || align=right | 1.3 km || 
|-id=064 bgcolor=#E9E9E9
| 107064 ||  || — || January 2, 2001 || Socorro || LINEAR || — || align=right | 1.8 km || 
|-id=065 bgcolor=#E9E9E9
| 107065 ||  || — || January 2, 2001 || Socorro || LINEAR || — || align=right | 2.7 km || 
|-id=066 bgcolor=#fefefe
| 107066 ||  || — || January 2, 2001 || Socorro || LINEAR || — || align=right | 1.6 km || 
|-id=067 bgcolor=#E9E9E9
| 107067 ||  || — || January 2, 2001 || Socorro || LINEAR || — || align=right | 2.7 km || 
|-id=068 bgcolor=#E9E9E9
| 107068 ||  || — || January 2, 2001 || Socorro || LINEAR || — || align=right | 1.9 km || 
|-id=069 bgcolor=#fefefe
| 107069 ||  || — || January 2, 2001 || Socorro || LINEAR || — || align=right | 4.0 km || 
|-id=070 bgcolor=#fefefe
| 107070 ||  || — || January 2, 2001 || Socorro || LINEAR || — || align=right | 1.9 km || 
|-id=071 bgcolor=#E9E9E9
| 107071 ||  || — || January 2, 2001 || Socorro || LINEAR || — || align=right | 2.5 km || 
|-id=072 bgcolor=#fefefe
| 107072 ||  || — || January 2, 2001 || Socorro || LINEAR || PHO || align=right | 3.0 km || 
|-id=073 bgcolor=#fefefe
| 107073 ||  || — || January 4, 2001 || Haleakala || NEAT || NYS || align=right | 1.1 km || 
|-id=074 bgcolor=#fefefe
| 107074 Ansonsylva ||  ||  || January 14, 2001 || Haleakala || NEAT || — || align=right | 1.3 km || 
|-id=075 bgcolor=#fefefe
| 107075 ||  || — || January 3, 2001 || Socorro || LINEAR || — || align=right | 1.4 km || 
|-id=076 bgcolor=#E9E9E9
| 107076 ||  || — || January 3, 2001 || Socorro || LINEAR || — || align=right | 4.1 km || 
|-id=077 bgcolor=#E9E9E9
| 107077 ||  || — || January 3, 2001 || Socorro || LINEAR || — || align=right | 2.0 km || 
|-id=078 bgcolor=#fefefe
| 107078 ||  || — || January 3, 2001 || Socorro || LINEAR || — || align=right | 1.4 km || 
|-id=079 bgcolor=#E9E9E9
| 107079 ||  || — || January 3, 2001 || Socorro || LINEAR || ADE || align=right | 5.4 km || 
|-id=080 bgcolor=#E9E9E9
| 107080 ||  || — || January 2, 2001 || Socorro || LINEAR || — || align=right | 2.4 km || 
|-id=081 bgcolor=#fefefe
| 107081 ||  || — || January 3, 2001 || Socorro || LINEAR || — || align=right | 3.5 km || 
|-id=082 bgcolor=#fefefe
| 107082 ||  || — || January 4, 2001 || Socorro || LINEAR || FLO || align=right | 1.2 km || 
|-id=083 bgcolor=#fefefe
| 107083 ||  || — || January 4, 2001 || Socorro || LINEAR || — || align=right | 1.8 km || 
|-id=084 bgcolor=#fefefe
| 107084 ||  || — || January 4, 2001 || Socorro || LINEAR || — || align=right | 1.9 km || 
|-id=085 bgcolor=#fefefe
| 107085 ||  || — || January 4, 2001 || Socorro || LINEAR || V || align=right | 1.8 km || 
|-id=086 bgcolor=#E9E9E9
| 107086 ||  || — || January 4, 2001 || Socorro || LINEAR || — || align=right | 1.9 km || 
|-id=087 bgcolor=#fefefe
| 107087 ||  || — || January 4, 2001 || Socorro || LINEAR || — || align=right | 1.6 km || 
|-id=088 bgcolor=#fefefe
| 107088 ||  || — || January 5, 2001 || Socorro || LINEAR || — || align=right | 1.7 km || 
|-id=089 bgcolor=#fefefe
| 107089 ||  || — || January 5, 2001 || Socorro || LINEAR || FLO || align=right | 1.1 km || 
|-id=090 bgcolor=#fefefe
| 107090 ||  || — || January 5, 2001 || Socorro || LINEAR || — || align=right | 2.4 km || 
|-id=091 bgcolor=#fefefe
| 107091 ||  || — || January 4, 2001 || Socorro || LINEAR || — || align=right | 1.7 km || 
|-id=092 bgcolor=#fefefe
| 107092 ||  || — || January 4, 2001 || Socorro || LINEAR || — || align=right | 1.5 km || 
|-id=093 bgcolor=#fefefe
| 107093 ||  || — || January 4, 2001 || Socorro || LINEAR || NYS || align=right | 1.5 km || 
|-id=094 bgcolor=#fefefe
| 107094 ||  || — || January 4, 2001 || Socorro || LINEAR || — || align=right | 1.3 km || 
|-id=095 bgcolor=#fefefe
| 107095 ||  || — || January 4, 2001 || Socorro || LINEAR || — || align=right | 3.8 km || 
|-id=096 bgcolor=#fefefe
| 107096 ||  || — || January 4, 2001 || Socorro || LINEAR || FLO || align=right | 2.4 km || 
|-id=097 bgcolor=#fefefe
| 107097 ||  || — || January 4, 2001 || Socorro || LINEAR || NYS || align=right | 1.4 km || 
|-id=098 bgcolor=#fefefe
| 107098 ||  || — || January 4, 2001 || Socorro || LINEAR || — || align=right | 2.3 km || 
|-id=099 bgcolor=#fefefe
| 107099 ||  || — || January 4, 2001 || Socorro || LINEAR || FLO || align=right | 1.3 km || 
|-id=100 bgcolor=#fefefe
| 107100 ||  || — || January 4, 2001 || Socorro || LINEAR || V || align=right | 1.3 km || 
|}

107101–107200 

|-bgcolor=#E9E9E9
| 107101 ||  || — || January 4, 2001 || Socorro || LINEAR || — || align=right | 2.7 km || 
|-id=102 bgcolor=#fefefe
| 107102 ||  || — || January 4, 2001 || Socorro || LINEAR || FLO || align=right | 2.8 km || 
|-id=103 bgcolor=#fefefe
| 107103 ||  || — || January 4, 2001 || Socorro || LINEAR || FLO || align=right | 1.5 km || 
|-id=104 bgcolor=#fefefe
| 107104 ||  || — || January 4, 2001 || Socorro || LINEAR || — || align=right | 1.8 km || 
|-id=105 bgcolor=#fefefe
| 107105 ||  || — || January 5, 2001 || Socorro || LINEAR || — || align=right | 2.1 km || 
|-id=106 bgcolor=#fefefe
| 107106 ||  || — || January 5, 2001 || Socorro || LINEAR || V || align=right | 1.3 km || 
|-id=107 bgcolor=#fefefe
| 107107 ||  || — || January 5, 2001 || Socorro || LINEAR || — || align=right | 2.1 km || 
|-id=108 bgcolor=#fefefe
| 107108 ||  || — || January 5, 2001 || Socorro || LINEAR || — || align=right | 2.0 km || 
|-id=109 bgcolor=#fefefe
| 107109 ||  || — || January 5, 2001 || Socorro || LINEAR || — || align=right | 1.8 km || 
|-id=110 bgcolor=#fefefe
| 107110 ||  || — || January 5, 2001 || Socorro || LINEAR || — || align=right | 5.4 km || 
|-id=111 bgcolor=#fefefe
| 107111 ||  || — || January 5, 2001 || Socorro || LINEAR || — || align=right | 4.1 km || 
|-id=112 bgcolor=#fefefe
| 107112 ||  || — || January 5, 2001 || Socorro || LINEAR || — || align=right | 5.2 km || 
|-id=113 bgcolor=#fefefe
| 107113 ||  || — || January 5, 2001 || Socorro || LINEAR || — || align=right | 2.8 km || 
|-id=114 bgcolor=#E9E9E9
| 107114 ||  || — || January 5, 2001 || Socorro || LINEAR || — || align=right | 3.3 km || 
|-id=115 bgcolor=#fefefe
| 107115 ||  || — || January 5, 2001 || Socorro || LINEAR || — || align=right | 2.8 km || 
|-id=116 bgcolor=#E9E9E9
| 107116 ||  || — || January 2, 2001 || Haleakala || NEAT || — || align=right | 3.0 km || 
|-id=117 bgcolor=#fefefe
| 107117 ||  || — || January 2, 2001 || Socorro || LINEAR || MAS || align=right | 1.9 km || 
|-id=118 bgcolor=#fefefe
| 107118 ||  || — || January 2, 2001 || Kitt Peak || Spacewatch || NYS || align=right | 1.3 km || 
|-id=119 bgcolor=#fefefe
| 107119 ||  || — || January 2, 2001 || Kitt Peak || Spacewatch || MAS || align=right data-sort-value="0.89" | 890 m || 
|-id=120 bgcolor=#fefefe
| 107120 ||  || — || January 3, 2001 || Socorro || LINEAR || — || align=right | 1.8 km || 
|-id=121 bgcolor=#d6d6d6
| 107121 ||  || — || January 3, 2001 || Anderson Mesa || LONEOS || BRA || align=right | 4.1 km || 
|-id=122 bgcolor=#fefefe
| 107122 ||  || — || January 3, 2001 || Socorro || LINEAR || NYS || align=right | 1.6 km || 
|-id=123 bgcolor=#fefefe
| 107123 ||  || — || January 4, 2001 || Anderson Mesa || LONEOS || — || align=right | 2.6 km || 
|-id=124 bgcolor=#fefefe
| 107124 ||  || — || January 15, 2001 || Socorro || LINEAR || — || align=right | 1.7 km || 
|-id=125 bgcolor=#E9E9E9
| 107125 ||  || — || January 15, 2001 || Socorro || LINEAR || — || align=right | 2.0 km || 
|-id=126 bgcolor=#fefefe
| 107126 ||  || — || January 15, 2001 || Socorro || LINEAR || H || align=right | 1.1 km || 
|-id=127 bgcolor=#fefefe
| 107127 ||  || — || January 15, 2001 || Socorro || LINEAR || — || align=right | 2.1 km || 
|-id=128 bgcolor=#fefefe
| 107128 ||  || — || January 15, 2001 || Socorro || LINEAR || PHO || align=right | 3.6 km || 
|-id=129 bgcolor=#fefefe
| 107129 ||  || — || January 15, 2001 || Socorro || LINEAR || — || align=right | 2.2 km || 
|-id=130 bgcolor=#fefefe
| 107130 ||  || — || January 15, 2001 || Socorro || LINEAR || — || align=right | 1.8 km || 
|-id=131 bgcolor=#fefefe
| 107131 ||  || — || January 4, 2001 || Socorro || LINEAR || — || align=right | 1.8 km || 
|-id=132 bgcolor=#fefefe
| 107132 ||  || — || January 15, 2001 || Socorro || LINEAR || H || align=right | 1.6 km || 
|-id=133 bgcolor=#fefefe
| 107133 ||  || — || January 15, 2001 || Kitt Peak || Spacewatch || MAS || align=right | 1.4 km || 
|-id=134 bgcolor=#C2FFFF
| 107134 ||  || — || January 15, 2001 || Kitt Peak || Spacewatch || L4 || align=right | 14 km || 
|-id=135 bgcolor=#fefefe
| 107135 || 2001 BH || — || January 17, 2001 || Oizumi || T. Kobayashi || — || align=right | 1.8 km || 
|-id=136 bgcolor=#fefefe
| 107136 || 2001 BQ || — || January 17, 2001 || Oizumi || T. Kobayashi || — || align=right | 4.2 km || 
|-id=137 bgcolor=#E9E9E9
| 107137 || 2001 BW || — || January 17, 2001 || Oizumi || T. Kobayashi || EUN || align=right | 2.4 km || 
|-id=138 bgcolor=#E9E9E9
| 107138 ||  || — || January 18, 2001 || Socorro || LINEAR || — || align=right | 2.2 km || 
|-id=139 bgcolor=#fefefe
| 107139 ||  || — || January 18, 2001 || Socorro || LINEAR || FLO || align=right | 1.1 km || 
|-id=140 bgcolor=#fefefe
| 107140 ||  || — || January 18, 2001 || Socorro || LINEAR || — || align=right | 2.0 km || 
|-id=141 bgcolor=#fefefe
| 107141 ||  || — || January 19, 2001 || Socorro || LINEAR || H || align=right data-sort-value="0.98" | 980 m || 
|-id=142 bgcolor=#fefefe
| 107142 ||  || — || January 19, 2001 || Socorro || LINEAR || — || align=right | 1.7 km || 
|-id=143 bgcolor=#fefefe
| 107143 ||  || — || January 19, 2001 || Socorro || LINEAR || ERI || align=right | 2.4 km || 
|-id=144 bgcolor=#fefefe
| 107144 ||  || — || January 19, 2001 || Socorro || LINEAR || — || align=right | 1.3 km || 
|-id=145 bgcolor=#E9E9E9
| 107145 ||  || — || January 19, 2001 || Socorro || LINEAR || NEM || align=right | 4.4 km || 
|-id=146 bgcolor=#fefefe
| 107146 ||  || — || January 19, 2001 || Socorro || LINEAR || NYS || align=right | 2.8 km || 
|-id=147 bgcolor=#fefefe
| 107147 ||  || — || January 19, 2001 || Socorro || LINEAR || NYS || align=right | 1.3 km || 
|-id=148 bgcolor=#fefefe
| 107148 ||  || — || January 20, 2001 || Socorro || LINEAR || H || align=right | 1.5 km || 
|-id=149 bgcolor=#fefefe
| 107149 ||  || — || January 20, 2001 || Socorro || LINEAR || — || align=right | 1.4 km || 
|-id=150 bgcolor=#FA8072
| 107150 ||  || — || January 20, 2001 || Socorro || LINEAR || — || align=right | 1.8 km || 
|-id=151 bgcolor=#d6d6d6
| 107151 ||  || — || January 17, 2001 || Socorro || LINEAR || URS || align=right | 9.3 km || 
|-id=152 bgcolor=#fefefe
| 107152 ||  || — || January 18, 2001 || Socorro || LINEAR || — || align=right | 3.8 km || 
|-id=153 bgcolor=#fefefe
| 107153 ||  || — || January 18, 2001 || Kitt Peak || Spacewatch || — || align=right | 2.0 km || 
|-id=154 bgcolor=#fefefe
| 107154 ||  || — || January 21, 2001 || Desert Beaver || W. K. Y. Yeung || NYS || align=right | 1.6 km || 
|-id=155 bgcolor=#E9E9E9
| 107155 ||  || — || January 21, 2001 || Desert Beaver || W. K. Y. Yeung || — || align=right | 4.3 km || 
|-id=156 bgcolor=#fefefe
| 107156 ||  || — || January 21, 2001 || Oizumi || T. Kobayashi || V || align=right | 1.7 km || 
|-id=157 bgcolor=#E9E9E9
| 107157 ||  || — || January 21, 2001 || Oizumi || T. Kobayashi || — || align=right | 4.1 km || 
|-id=158 bgcolor=#fefefe
| 107158 ||  || — || January 21, 2001 || Oizumi || T. Kobayashi || — || align=right | 5.4 km || 
|-id=159 bgcolor=#fefefe
| 107159 ||  || — || January 19, 2001 || Socorro || LINEAR || — || align=right | 1.6 km || 
|-id=160 bgcolor=#fefefe
| 107160 ||  || — || January 19, 2001 || Socorro || LINEAR || V || align=right | 1.1 km || 
|-id=161 bgcolor=#fefefe
| 107161 ||  || — || January 19, 2001 || Socorro || LINEAR || NYS || align=right | 1.3 km || 
|-id=162 bgcolor=#fefefe
| 107162 ||  || — || January 19, 2001 || Socorro || LINEAR || — || align=right | 1.6 km || 
|-id=163 bgcolor=#fefefe
| 107163 ||  || — || January 19, 2001 || Socorro || LINEAR || NYS || align=right | 1.2 km || 
|-id=164 bgcolor=#fefefe
| 107164 ||  || — || January 19, 2001 || Socorro || LINEAR || NYS || align=right | 2.7 km || 
|-id=165 bgcolor=#fefefe
| 107165 ||  || — || January 19, 2001 || Socorro || LINEAR || — || align=right | 1.3 km || 
|-id=166 bgcolor=#fefefe
| 107166 ||  || — || January 19, 2001 || Socorro || LINEAR || V || align=right | 1.2 km || 
|-id=167 bgcolor=#fefefe
| 107167 ||  || — || January 19, 2001 || Socorro || LINEAR || — || align=right | 2.0 km || 
|-id=168 bgcolor=#fefefe
| 107168 ||  || — || January 20, 2001 || Socorro || LINEAR || — || align=right | 1.9 km || 
|-id=169 bgcolor=#fefefe
| 107169 ||  || — || January 20, 2001 || Socorro || LINEAR || V || align=right | 1.5 km || 
|-id=170 bgcolor=#fefefe
| 107170 ||  || — || January 20, 2001 || Socorro || LINEAR || — || align=right | 1.2 km || 
|-id=171 bgcolor=#d6d6d6
| 107171 ||  || — || January 20, 2001 || Socorro || LINEAR || — || align=right | 6.2 km || 
|-id=172 bgcolor=#fefefe
| 107172 ||  || — || January 20, 2001 || Socorro || LINEAR || — || align=right | 1.6 km || 
|-id=173 bgcolor=#fefefe
| 107173 ||  || — || January 20, 2001 || Socorro || LINEAR || NYS || align=right | 1.3 km || 
|-id=174 bgcolor=#fefefe
| 107174 ||  || — || January 20, 2001 || Socorro || LINEAR || — || align=right | 1.4 km || 
|-id=175 bgcolor=#fefefe
| 107175 ||  || — || January 20, 2001 || Socorro || LINEAR || NYS || align=right | 1.0 km || 
|-id=176 bgcolor=#fefefe
| 107176 ||  || — || January 20, 2001 || Socorro || LINEAR || — || align=right | 1.6 km || 
|-id=177 bgcolor=#fefefe
| 107177 ||  || — || January 20, 2001 || Socorro || LINEAR || NYS || align=right | 1.3 km || 
|-id=178 bgcolor=#C2FFFF
| 107178 ||  || — || January 20, 2001 || Socorro || LINEAR || L4 || align=right | 20 km || 
|-id=179 bgcolor=#fefefe
| 107179 ||  || — || January 20, 2001 || Socorro || LINEAR || NYS || align=right | 1.2 km || 
|-id=180 bgcolor=#fefefe
| 107180 ||  || — || January 20, 2001 || Socorro || LINEAR || — || align=right | 1.8 km || 
|-id=181 bgcolor=#d6d6d6
| 107181 ||  || — || January 20, 2001 || Socorro || LINEAR || 7:4 || align=right | 7.8 km || 
|-id=182 bgcolor=#fefefe
| 107182 ||  || — || January 20, 2001 || Socorro || LINEAR || NYS || align=right | 3.1 km || 
|-id=183 bgcolor=#fefefe
| 107183 ||  || — || January 20, 2001 || Socorro || LINEAR || NYS || align=right | 3.9 km || 
|-id=184 bgcolor=#fefefe
| 107184 ||  || — || January 20, 2001 || Socorro || LINEAR || FLO || align=right | 1.6 km || 
|-id=185 bgcolor=#fefefe
| 107185 ||  || — || January 20, 2001 || Socorro || LINEAR || EUT || align=right | 1.4 km || 
|-id=186 bgcolor=#fefefe
| 107186 ||  || — || January 20, 2001 || Socorro || LINEAR || — || align=right | 1.8 km || 
|-id=187 bgcolor=#fefefe
| 107187 ||  || — || January 20, 2001 || Socorro || LINEAR || FLO || align=right | 1.1 km || 
|-id=188 bgcolor=#E9E9E9
| 107188 ||  || — || January 20, 2001 || Socorro || LINEAR || EUN || align=right | 3.1 km || 
|-id=189 bgcolor=#fefefe
| 107189 ||  || — || January 20, 2001 || Socorro || LINEAR || V || align=right | 1.6 km || 
|-id=190 bgcolor=#fefefe
| 107190 ||  || — || January 20, 2001 || Socorro || LINEAR || NYS || align=right | 1.3 km || 
|-id=191 bgcolor=#fefefe
| 107191 ||  || — || January 20, 2001 || Socorro || LINEAR || NYS || align=right | 1.5 km || 
|-id=192 bgcolor=#fefefe
| 107192 ||  || — || January 20, 2001 || Socorro || LINEAR || MAS || align=right | 1.3 km || 
|-id=193 bgcolor=#fefefe
| 107193 ||  || — || January 20, 2001 || Socorro || LINEAR || — || align=right | 1.7 km || 
|-id=194 bgcolor=#fefefe
| 107194 ||  || — || January 20, 2001 || Socorro || LINEAR || — || align=right | 1.3 km || 
|-id=195 bgcolor=#fefefe
| 107195 ||  || — || January 20, 2001 || Socorro || LINEAR || — || align=right | 1.8 km || 
|-id=196 bgcolor=#fefefe
| 107196 ||  || — || January 20, 2001 || Socorro || LINEAR || NYS || align=right | 1.7 km || 
|-id=197 bgcolor=#E9E9E9
| 107197 ||  || — || January 20, 2001 || Socorro || LINEAR || — || align=right | 2.6 km || 
|-id=198 bgcolor=#fefefe
| 107198 ||  || — || January 20, 2001 || Socorro || LINEAR || NYS || align=right | 1.4 km || 
|-id=199 bgcolor=#fefefe
| 107199 ||  || — || January 20, 2001 || Socorro || LINEAR || — || align=right | 1.8 km || 
|-id=200 bgcolor=#fefefe
| 107200 ||  || — || January 20, 2001 || Socorro || LINEAR || NYS || align=right | 1.7 km || 
|}

107201–107300 

|-bgcolor=#fefefe
| 107201 ||  || — || January 20, 2001 || Socorro || LINEAR || — || align=right | 1.8 km || 
|-id=202 bgcolor=#E9E9E9
| 107202 ||  || — || January 20, 2001 || Socorro || LINEAR || — || align=right | 1.8 km || 
|-id=203 bgcolor=#fefefe
| 107203 ||  || — || January 20, 2001 || Socorro || LINEAR || — || align=right | 1.9 km || 
|-id=204 bgcolor=#E9E9E9
| 107204 ||  || — || January 20, 2001 || Socorro || LINEAR || EUN || align=right | 2.6 km || 
|-id=205 bgcolor=#fefefe
| 107205 ||  || — || January 20, 2001 || Socorro || LINEAR || — || align=right | 1.5 km || 
|-id=206 bgcolor=#fefefe
| 107206 ||  || — || January 20, 2001 || Socorro || LINEAR || NYS || align=right | 1.2 km || 
|-id=207 bgcolor=#fefefe
| 107207 ||  || — || January 20, 2001 || Socorro || LINEAR || V || align=right | 1.5 km || 
|-id=208 bgcolor=#fefefe
| 107208 ||  || — || January 22, 2001 || Haleakala || NEAT || PHO || align=right | 2.0 km || 
|-id=209 bgcolor=#fefefe
| 107209 ||  || — || January 23, 2001 || Kitt Peak || Spacewatch || — || align=right | 1.5 km || 
|-id=210 bgcolor=#E9E9E9
| 107210 ||  || — || January 21, 2001 || Haleakala || NEAT || — || align=right | 2.2 km || 
|-id=211 bgcolor=#fefefe
| 107211 ||  || — || January 24, 2001 || Socorro || LINEAR || KLI || align=right | 3.4 km || 
|-id=212 bgcolor=#fefefe
| 107212 ||  || — || January 24, 2001 || Socorro || LINEAR || — || align=right | 1.5 km || 
|-id=213 bgcolor=#fefefe
| 107213 ||  || — || January 25, 2001 || Oaxaca || J. M. Roe || NYS || align=right | 1.3 km || 
|-id=214 bgcolor=#fefefe
| 107214 ||  || — || January 19, 2001 || Socorro || LINEAR || — || align=right | 2.0 km || 
|-id=215 bgcolor=#fefefe
| 107215 ||  || — || January 19, 2001 || Socorro || LINEAR || — || align=right | 1.7 km || 
|-id=216 bgcolor=#fefefe
| 107216 ||  || — || January 19, 2001 || Socorro || LINEAR || — || align=right | 5.1 km || 
|-id=217 bgcolor=#fefefe
| 107217 ||  || — || January 20, 2001 || Socorro || LINEAR || — || align=right | 2.3 km || 
|-id=218 bgcolor=#fefefe
| 107218 ||  || — || January 21, 2001 || Socorro || LINEAR || — || align=right | 1.9 km || 
|-id=219 bgcolor=#fefefe
| 107219 ||  || — || January 21, 2001 || Socorro || LINEAR || ERI || align=right | 3.4 km || 
|-id=220 bgcolor=#E9E9E9
| 107220 ||  || — || January 21, 2001 || Socorro || LINEAR || — || align=right | 1.8 km || 
|-id=221 bgcolor=#fefefe
| 107221 ||  || — || January 21, 2001 || Socorro || LINEAR || — || align=right | 3.0 km || 
|-id=222 bgcolor=#fefefe
| 107222 ||  || — || January 21, 2001 || Socorro || LINEAR || ERI || align=right | 3.5 km || 
|-id=223 bgcolor=#E9E9E9
| 107223 Ripero ||  ||  || January 21, 2001 || Pla D'Arguines || R. Ferrando || — || align=right | 3.6 km || 
|-id=224 bgcolor=#E9E9E9
| 107224 ||  || — || January 28, 2001 || Oizumi || T. Kobayashi || — || align=right | 5.6 km || 
|-id=225 bgcolor=#FA8072
| 107225 ||  || — || January 27, 2001 || Haleakala || NEAT || — || align=right | 1.7 km || 
|-id=226 bgcolor=#fefefe
| 107226 ||  || — || January 17, 2001 || Kitt Peak || Spacewatch || MAS || align=right | 1.0 km || 
|-id=227 bgcolor=#fefefe
| 107227 ||  || — || January 17, 2001 || Kitt Peak || Spacewatch || — || align=right | 1.7 km || 
|-id=228 bgcolor=#fefefe
| 107228 ||  || — || January 17, 2001 || Haleakala || NEAT || V || align=right | 1.1 km || 
|-id=229 bgcolor=#E9E9E9
| 107229 ||  || — || January 17, 2001 || Haleakala || NEAT || — || align=right | 4.3 km || 
|-id=230 bgcolor=#fefefe
| 107230 ||  || — || January 17, 2001 || Haleakala || NEAT || NYS || align=right | 1.0 km || 
|-id=231 bgcolor=#fefefe
| 107231 ||  || — || January 18, 2001 || Haleakala || NEAT || FLO || align=right | 1.2 km || 
|-id=232 bgcolor=#fefefe
| 107232 ||  || — || January 18, 2001 || Haleakala || NEAT || — || align=right | 3.1 km || 
|-id=233 bgcolor=#fefefe
| 107233 ||  || — || January 18, 2001 || Kitt Peak || Spacewatch || NYS || align=right | 1.4 km || 
|-id=234 bgcolor=#d6d6d6
| 107234 ||  || — || January 18, 2001 || Kitt Peak || Spacewatch || — || align=right | 4.8 km || 
|-id=235 bgcolor=#fefefe
| 107235 ||  || — || January 18, 2001 || Haleakala || NEAT || V || align=right | 1.3 km || 
|-id=236 bgcolor=#fefefe
| 107236 ||  || — || January 19, 2001 || Socorro || LINEAR || V || align=right | 1.4 km || 
|-id=237 bgcolor=#E9E9E9
| 107237 ||  || — || January 19, 2001 || Socorro || LINEAR || — || align=right | 1.9 km || 
|-id=238 bgcolor=#fefefe
| 107238 ||  || — || January 19, 2001 || Socorro || LINEAR || — || align=right | 1.6 km || 
|-id=239 bgcolor=#E9E9E9
| 107239 ||  || — || January 19, 2001 || Kitt Peak || Spacewatch || — || align=right | 5.1 km || 
|-id=240 bgcolor=#fefefe
| 107240 ||  || — || January 20, 2001 || Haleakala || NEAT || — || align=right | 1.9 km || 
|-id=241 bgcolor=#fefefe
| 107241 ||  || — || January 21, 2001 || Socorro || LINEAR || — || align=right | 1.8 km || 
|-id=242 bgcolor=#fefefe
| 107242 ||  || — || January 21, 2001 || Socorro || LINEAR || — || align=right | 1.7 km || 
|-id=243 bgcolor=#fefefe
| 107243 ||  || — || January 21, 2001 || Socorro || LINEAR || NYS || align=right | 1.3 km || 
|-id=244 bgcolor=#fefefe
| 107244 ||  || — || January 21, 2001 || Socorro || LINEAR || V || align=right | 1.5 km || 
|-id=245 bgcolor=#fefefe
| 107245 ||  || — || January 21, 2001 || Socorro || LINEAR || — || align=right | 1.6 km || 
|-id=246 bgcolor=#fefefe
| 107246 ||  || — || January 21, 2001 || Socorro || LINEAR || NYS || align=right | 1.4 km || 
|-id=247 bgcolor=#E9E9E9
| 107247 ||  || — || January 21, 2001 || Socorro || LINEAR || — || align=right | 3.5 km || 
|-id=248 bgcolor=#fefefe
| 107248 ||  || — || January 21, 2001 || Socorro || LINEAR || NYS || align=right | 1.2 km || 
|-id=249 bgcolor=#fefefe
| 107249 ||  || — || January 21, 2001 || Socorro || LINEAR || — || align=right | 1.9 km || 
|-id=250 bgcolor=#fefefe
| 107250 ||  || — || January 21, 2001 || Socorro || LINEAR || — || align=right | 3.3 km || 
|-id=251 bgcolor=#fefefe
| 107251 ||  || — || January 26, 2001 || Socorro || LINEAR || — || align=right | 1.5 km || 
|-id=252 bgcolor=#E9E9E9
| 107252 ||  || — || January 26, 2001 || Socorro || LINEAR || — || align=right | 4.6 km || 
|-id=253 bgcolor=#E9E9E9
| 107253 ||  || — || January 26, 2001 || Socorro || LINEAR || — || align=right | 2.2 km || 
|-id=254 bgcolor=#fefefe
| 107254 ||  || — || January 26, 2001 || Socorro || LINEAR || — || align=right | 1.7 km || 
|-id=255 bgcolor=#fefefe
| 107255 ||  || — || January 29, 2001 || Socorro || LINEAR || — || align=right | 1.8 km || 
|-id=256 bgcolor=#fefefe
| 107256 ||  || — || January 29, 2001 || Socorro || LINEAR || — || align=right | 1.7 km || 
|-id=257 bgcolor=#fefefe
| 107257 ||  || — || January 29, 2001 || Socorro || LINEAR || — || align=right | 1.8 km || 
|-id=258 bgcolor=#fefefe
| 107258 ||  || — || January 29, 2001 || Socorro || LINEAR || ERI || align=right | 4.7 km || 
|-id=259 bgcolor=#E9E9E9
| 107259 ||  || — || January 29, 2001 || Socorro || LINEAR || — || align=right | 1.6 km || 
|-id=260 bgcolor=#E9E9E9
| 107260 ||  || — || January 29, 2001 || Socorro || LINEAR || GEF || align=right | 2.4 km || 
|-id=261 bgcolor=#fefefe
| 107261 ||  || — || January 29, 2001 || Socorro || LINEAR || — || align=right | 2.4 km || 
|-id=262 bgcolor=#fefefe
| 107262 ||  || — || January 30, 2001 || Socorro || LINEAR || V || align=right | 1.3 km || 
|-id=263 bgcolor=#fefefe
| 107263 ||  || — || January 26, 2001 || Socorro || LINEAR || — || align=right | 1.6 km || 
|-id=264 bgcolor=#fefefe
| 107264 ||  || — || January 31, 2001 || Socorro || LINEAR || NYS || align=right | 1.7 km || 
|-id=265 bgcolor=#fefefe
| 107265 ||  || — || January 31, 2001 || Socorro || LINEAR || — || align=right | 1.8 km || 
|-id=266 bgcolor=#fefefe
| 107266 ||  || — || January 31, 2001 || Socorro || LINEAR || MAS || align=right | 1.8 km || 
|-id=267 bgcolor=#fefefe
| 107267 ||  || — || January 31, 2001 || Socorro || LINEAR || — || align=right | 2.0 km || 
|-id=268 bgcolor=#fefefe
| 107268 ||  || — || January 31, 2001 || Socorro || LINEAR || — || align=right | 2.0 km || 
|-id=269 bgcolor=#fefefe
| 107269 ||  || — || January 31, 2001 || Socorro || LINEAR || PHO || align=right | 2.5 km || 
|-id=270 bgcolor=#fefefe
| 107270 ||  || — || January 21, 2001 || Socorro || LINEAR || — || align=right | 1.6 km || 
|-id=271 bgcolor=#E9E9E9
| 107271 ||  || — || January 29, 2001 || Socorro || LINEAR || — || align=right | 2.2 km || 
|-id=272 bgcolor=#fefefe
| 107272 ||  || — || January 29, 2001 || Socorro || LINEAR || EUT || align=right | 1.3 km || 
|-id=273 bgcolor=#E9E9E9
| 107273 ||  || — || January 29, 2001 || Socorro || LINEAR || — || align=right | 2.5 km || 
|-id=274 bgcolor=#fefefe
| 107274 ||  || — || January 31, 2001 || Socorro || LINEAR || — || align=right | 3.7 km || 
|-id=275 bgcolor=#fefefe
| 107275 ||  || — || January 31, 2001 || Socorro || LINEAR || ERI || align=right | 3.0 km || 
|-id=276 bgcolor=#fefefe
| 107276 ||  || — || January 29, 2001 || Socorro || LINEAR || NYS || align=right | 1.00 km || 
|-id=277 bgcolor=#fefefe
| 107277 ||  || — || January 27, 2001 || Haleakala || NEAT || — || align=right | 3.3 km || 
|-id=278 bgcolor=#fefefe
| 107278 ||  || — || January 29, 2001 || Carbuncle Hill || W. K. Y. Yeung || V || align=right | 1.1 km || 
|-id=279 bgcolor=#fefefe
| 107279 ||  || — || January 29, 2001 || Haleakala || NEAT || — || align=right | 2.1 km || 
|-id=280 bgcolor=#fefefe
| 107280 ||  || — || January 31, 2001 || Socorro || LINEAR || — || align=right | 1.8 km || 
|-id=281 bgcolor=#fefefe
| 107281 ||  || — || January 26, 2001 || Kitt Peak || Spacewatch || NYS || align=right | 1.5 km || 
|-id=282 bgcolor=#d6d6d6
| 107282 ||  || — || January 26, 2001 || Kitt Peak || Spacewatch || 628 || align=right | 3.3 km || 
|-id=283 bgcolor=#fefefe
| 107283 ||  || — || January 26, 2001 || Socorro || LINEAR || PHO || align=right | 2.4 km || 
|-id=284 bgcolor=#E9E9E9
| 107284 ||  || — || January 26, 2001 || Socorro || LINEAR || — || align=right | 2.4 km || 
|-id=285 bgcolor=#fefefe
| 107285 ||  || — || January 26, 2001 || Socorro || LINEAR || V || align=right | 1.6 km || 
|-id=286 bgcolor=#fefefe
| 107286 ||  || — || January 26, 2001 || Kitt Peak || Spacewatch || MAS || align=right | 1.3 km || 
|-id=287 bgcolor=#fefefe
| 107287 ||  || — || January 21, 2001 || Socorro || LINEAR || NYS || align=right | 1.2 km || 
|-id=288 bgcolor=#fefefe
| 107288 ||  || — || January 21, 2001 || Socorro || LINEAR || — || align=right | 1.4 km || 
|-id=289 bgcolor=#fefefe
| 107289 ||  || — || January 26, 2001 || Socorro || LINEAR || — || align=right | 1.9 km || 
|-id=290 bgcolor=#fefefe
| 107290 || 2001 CA || — || February 1, 2001 || Črni Vrh || Črni Vrh || NYS || align=right | 1.3 km || 
|-id=291 bgcolor=#fefefe
| 107291 || 2001 CF || — || February 1, 2001 || Višnjan Observatory || K. Korlević || — || align=right | 2.6 km || 
|-id=292 bgcolor=#fefefe
| 107292 || 2001 CZ || — || February 1, 2001 || Socorro || LINEAR || — || align=right | 1.6 km || 
|-id=293 bgcolor=#fefefe
| 107293 ||  || — || February 1, 2001 || Socorro || LINEAR || — || align=right | 2.1 km || 
|-id=294 bgcolor=#E9E9E9
| 107294 ||  || — || February 1, 2001 || Socorro || LINEAR || — || align=right | 2.2 km || 
|-id=295 bgcolor=#fefefe
| 107295 ||  || — || February 1, 2001 || Socorro || LINEAR || NYS || align=right | 1.5 km || 
|-id=296 bgcolor=#E9E9E9
| 107296 ||  || — || February 1, 2001 || Socorro || LINEAR || DOR || align=right | 5.6 km || 
|-id=297 bgcolor=#fefefe
| 107297 ||  || — || February 1, 2001 || Socorro || LINEAR || — || align=right | 4.8 km || 
|-id=298 bgcolor=#E9E9E9
| 107298 ||  || — || February 1, 2001 || Socorro || LINEAR || GER || align=right | 3.0 km || 
|-id=299 bgcolor=#fefefe
| 107299 ||  || — || February 1, 2001 || Socorro || LINEAR || — || align=right | 2.7 km || 
|-id=300 bgcolor=#fefefe
| 107300 ||  || — || February 1, 2001 || Socorro || LINEAR || — || align=right | 2.0 km || 
|}

107301–107400 

|-bgcolor=#fefefe
| 107301 ||  || — || February 1, 2001 || Socorro || LINEAR || — || align=right | 2.0 km || 
|-id=302 bgcolor=#E9E9E9
| 107302 ||  || — || February 1, 2001 || Socorro || LINEAR || — || align=right | 1.7 km || 
|-id=303 bgcolor=#fefefe
| 107303 ||  || — || February 1, 2001 || Socorro || LINEAR || NYS || align=right | 2.5 km || 
|-id=304 bgcolor=#fefefe
| 107304 ||  || — || February 1, 2001 || Socorro || LINEAR || FLO || align=right | 1.2 km || 
|-id=305 bgcolor=#fefefe
| 107305 ||  || — || February 1, 2001 || Socorro || LINEAR || — || align=right | 1.8 km || 
|-id=306 bgcolor=#fefefe
| 107306 ||  || — || February 1, 2001 || Socorro || LINEAR || — || align=right | 1.6 km || 
|-id=307 bgcolor=#fefefe
| 107307 ||  || — || February 1, 2001 || Socorro || LINEAR || — || align=right | 1.5 km || 
|-id=308 bgcolor=#fefefe
| 107308 ||  || — || February 1, 2001 || Socorro || LINEAR || FLO || align=right | 1.1 km || 
|-id=309 bgcolor=#fefefe
| 107309 ||  || — || February 1, 2001 || Socorro || LINEAR || FLO || align=right | 1.3 km || 
|-id=310 bgcolor=#fefefe
| 107310 ||  || — || February 1, 2001 || Socorro || LINEAR || NYS || align=right | 1.1 km || 
|-id=311 bgcolor=#fefefe
| 107311 ||  || — || February 2, 2001 || Oaxaca || J. M. Roe || — || align=right | 1.5 km || 
|-id=312 bgcolor=#E9E9E9
| 107312 ||  || — || February 3, 2001 || Piera || J. Guarro i Fló || — || align=right | 2.8 km || 
|-id=313 bgcolor=#fefefe
| 107313 ||  || — || February 1, 2001 || Socorro || LINEAR || NYS || align=right | 1.3 km || 
|-id=314 bgcolor=#E9E9E9
| 107314 ||  || — || February 1, 2001 || Socorro || LINEAR || RAF || align=right | 1.8 km || 
|-id=315 bgcolor=#fefefe
| 107315 ||  || — || February 1, 2001 || Socorro || LINEAR || — || align=right | 1.1 km || 
|-id=316 bgcolor=#E9E9E9
| 107316 ||  || — || February 1, 2001 || Socorro || LINEAR || — || align=right | 2.7 km || 
|-id=317 bgcolor=#E9E9E9
| 107317 ||  || — || February 1, 2001 || Socorro || LINEAR || — || align=right | 4.3 km || 
|-id=318 bgcolor=#fefefe
| 107318 ||  || — || February 1, 2001 || Socorro || LINEAR || V || align=right | 1.5 km || 
|-id=319 bgcolor=#fefefe
| 107319 ||  || — || February 1, 2001 || Socorro || LINEAR || NYS || align=right | 2.5 km || 
|-id=320 bgcolor=#fefefe
| 107320 ||  || — || February 1, 2001 || Socorro || LINEAR || NYS || align=right | 1.7 km || 
|-id=321 bgcolor=#d6d6d6
| 107321 ||  || — || February 1, 2001 || Socorro || LINEAR || — || align=right | 6.6 km || 
|-id=322 bgcolor=#d6d6d6
| 107322 ||  || — || February 1, 2001 || Socorro || LINEAR || — || align=right | 3.6 km || 
|-id=323 bgcolor=#fefefe
| 107323 ||  || — || February 1, 2001 || Socorro || LINEAR || MAS || align=right | 2.0 km || 
|-id=324 bgcolor=#fefefe
| 107324 ||  || — || February 1, 2001 || Socorro || LINEAR || FLO || align=right | 1.2 km || 
|-id=325 bgcolor=#fefefe
| 107325 ||  || — || February 1, 2001 || Socorro || LINEAR || — || align=right | 1.9 km || 
|-id=326 bgcolor=#E9E9E9
| 107326 ||  || — || February 1, 2001 || Socorro || LINEAR || — || align=right | 1.7 km || 
|-id=327 bgcolor=#fefefe
| 107327 ||  || — || February 1, 2001 || Socorro || LINEAR || — || align=right | 1.7 km || 
|-id=328 bgcolor=#E9E9E9
| 107328 ||  || — || February 1, 2001 || Socorro || LINEAR || EUN || align=right | 3.0 km || 
|-id=329 bgcolor=#fefefe
| 107329 ||  || — || February 1, 2001 || Socorro || LINEAR || NYS || align=right | 1.1 km || 
|-id=330 bgcolor=#fefefe
| 107330 ||  || — || February 1, 2001 || Socorro || LINEAR || — || align=right | 1.4 km || 
|-id=331 bgcolor=#E9E9E9
| 107331 ||  || — || February 1, 2001 || Socorro || LINEAR || — || align=right | 2.8 km || 
|-id=332 bgcolor=#E9E9E9
| 107332 ||  || — || February 2, 2001 || Socorro || LINEAR || — || align=right | 3.1 km || 
|-id=333 bgcolor=#fefefe
| 107333 ||  || — || February 2, 2001 || Socorro || LINEAR || — || align=right | 1.3 km || 
|-id=334 bgcolor=#fefefe
| 107334 ||  || — || February 2, 2001 || Socorro || LINEAR || EUT || align=right | 1.1 km || 
|-id=335 bgcolor=#fefefe
| 107335 ||  || — || February 2, 2001 || Socorro || LINEAR || MAS || align=right | 1.2 km || 
|-id=336 bgcolor=#fefefe
| 107336 ||  || — || February 2, 2001 || Socorro || LINEAR || — || align=right | 1.0 km || 
|-id=337 bgcolor=#fefefe
| 107337 ||  || — || February 1, 2001 || Anderson Mesa || LONEOS || FLO || align=right | 1.4 km || 
|-id=338 bgcolor=#fefefe
| 107338 ||  || — || February 1, 2001 || Anderson Mesa || LONEOS || NYS || align=right | 2.6 km || 
|-id=339 bgcolor=#d6d6d6
| 107339 ||  || — || February 1, 2001 || Anderson Mesa || LONEOS || KOR || align=right | 3.2 km || 
|-id=340 bgcolor=#E9E9E9
| 107340 ||  || — || February 1, 2001 || Anderson Mesa || LONEOS || — || align=right | 3.1 km || 
|-id=341 bgcolor=#E9E9E9
| 107341 ||  || — || February 1, 2001 || Anderson Mesa || LONEOS || — || align=right | 5.2 km || 
|-id=342 bgcolor=#fefefe
| 107342 ||  || — || February 1, 2001 || Anderson Mesa || LONEOS || — || align=right | 1.5 km || 
|-id=343 bgcolor=#fefefe
| 107343 ||  || — || February 1, 2001 || Anderson Mesa || LONEOS || MAS || align=right | 1.4 km || 
|-id=344 bgcolor=#fefefe
| 107344 ||  || — || February 1, 2001 || Anderson Mesa || LONEOS || NYS || align=right | 2.7 km || 
|-id=345 bgcolor=#E9E9E9
| 107345 ||  || — || February 1, 2001 || Anderson Mesa || LONEOS || EUN || align=right | 2.0 km || 
|-id=346 bgcolor=#fefefe
| 107346 ||  || — || February 1, 2001 || Anderson Mesa || LONEOS || — || align=right | 1.8 km || 
|-id=347 bgcolor=#E9E9E9
| 107347 ||  || — || February 1, 2001 || Socorro || LINEAR || WIT || align=right | 2.4 km || 
|-id=348 bgcolor=#fefefe
| 107348 ||  || — || February 1, 2001 || Socorro || LINEAR || NYS || align=right | 1.1 km || 
|-id=349 bgcolor=#E9E9E9
| 107349 ||  || — || February 1, 2001 || Socorro || LINEAR || — || align=right | 3.0 km || 
|-id=350 bgcolor=#fefefe
| 107350 ||  || — || February 1, 2001 || Socorro || LINEAR || FLO || align=right | 1.3 km || 
|-id=351 bgcolor=#fefefe
| 107351 ||  || — || February 1, 2001 || Socorro || LINEAR || — || align=right | 1.6 km || 
|-id=352 bgcolor=#fefefe
| 107352 ||  || — || February 1, 2001 || Kitt Peak || Spacewatch || — || align=right | 1.8 km || 
|-id=353 bgcolor=#fefefe
| 107353 ||  || — || February 1, 2001 || Kitt Peak || Spacewatch || MAS || align=right | 1.3 km || 
|-id=354 bgcolor=#fefefe
| 107354 ||  || — || February 2, 2001 || Anderson Mesa || LONEOS || — || align=right | 3.1 km || 
|-id=355 bgcolor=#E9E9E9
| 107355 ||  || — || February 2, 2001 || Anderson Mesa || LONEOS || — || align=right | 2.5 km || 
|-id=356 bgcolor=#E9E9E9
| 107356 ||  || — || February 2, 2001 || Anderson Mesa || LONEOS || — || align=right | 2.6 km || 
|-id=357 bgcolor=#d6d6d6
| 107357 ||  || — || February 2, 2001 || Anderson Mesa || LONEOS || — || align=right | 7.1 km || 
|-id=358 bgcolor=#fefefe
| 107358 ||  || — || February 2, 2001 || Anderson Mesa || LONEOS || — || align=right | 4.2 km || 
|-id=359 bgcolor=#fefefe
| 107359 ||  || — || February 2, 2001 || Anderson Mesa || LONEOS || — || align=right | 1.6 km || 
|-id=360 bgcolor=#fefefe
| 107360 ||  || — || February 2, 2001 || Anderson Mesa || LONEOS || — || align=right | 1.5 km || 
|-id=361 bgcolor=#fefefe
| 107361 ||  || — || February 2, 2001 || Anderson Mesa || LONEOS || FLO || align=right | 1.5 km || 
|-id=362 bgcolor=#E9E9E9
| 107362 ||  || — || February 2, 2001 || Anderson Mesa || LONEOS || BRG || align=right | 2.6 km || 
|-id=363 bgcolor=#fefefe
| 107363 ||  || — || February 2, 2001 || Anderson Mesa || LONEOS || FLO || align=right | 1.6 km || 
|-id=364 bgcolor=#fefefe
| 107364 ||  || — || February 2, 2001 || Anderson Mesa || LONEOS || — || align=right | 1.5 km || 
|-id=365 bgcolor=#fefefe
| 107365 ||  || — || February 2, 2001 || Anderson Mesa || LONEOS || NYS || align=right | 1.2 km || 
|-id=366 bgcolor=#d6d6d6
| 107366 ||  || — || February 2, 2001 || Anderson Mesa || LONEOS || KOR || align=right | 2.9 km || 
|-id=367 bgcolor=#fefefe
| 107367 ||  || — || February 2, 2001 || Anderson Mesa || LONEOS || V || align=right | 1.4 km || 
|-id=368 bgcolor=#E9E9E9
| 107368 ||  || — || February 2, 2001 || Anderson Mesa || LONEOS || — || align=right | 2.3 km || 
|-id=369 bgcolor=#E9E9E9
| 107369 ||  || — || February 2, 2001 || Anderson Mesa || LONEOS || MIT || align=right | 5.0 km || 
|-id=370 bgcolor=#E9E9E9
| 107370 ||  || — || February 2, 2001 || Haleakala || NEAT || — || align=right | 5.1 km || 
|-id=371 bgcolor=#fefefe
| 107371 ||  || — || February 12, 2001 || Prescott || P. G. Comba || — || align=right | 2.0 km || 
|-id=372 bgcolor=#fefefe
| 107372 ||  || — || February 2, 2001 || Socorro || LINEAR || — || align=right | 1.6 km || 
|-id=373 bgcolor=#fefefe
| 107373 ||  || — || February 5, 2001 || Socorro || LINEAR || H || align=right | 1.5 km || 
|-id=374 bgcolor=#E9E9E9
| 107374 ||  || — || February 13, 2001 || Socorro || LINEAR || EUN || align=right | 2.9 km || 
|-id=375 bgcolor=#E9E9E9
| 107375 ||  || — || February 13, 2001 || Socorro || LINEAR || — || align=right | 2.7 km || 
|-id=376 bgcolor=#fefefe
| 107376 ||  || — || February 15, 2001 || Oizumi || T. Kobayashi || — || align=right | 1.6 km || 
|-id=377 bgcolor=#fefefe
| 107377 ||  || — || February 15, 2001 || Oizumi || T. Kobayashi || V || align=right | 1.4 km || 
|-id=378 bgcolor=#fefefe
| 107378 ||  || — || February 13, 2001 || Kitt Peak || Spacewatch || PHO || align=right | 2.5 km || 
|-id=379 bgcolor=#E9E9E9
| 107379 Johnlogan ||  ||  || February 15, 2001 || Nogales || Tenagra II Obs. || — || align=right | 3.2 km || 
|-id=380 bgcolor=#d6d6d6
| 107380 ||  || — || February 13, 2001 || Socorro || LINEAR || — || align=right | 6.9 km || 
|-id=381 bgcolor=#fefefe
| 107381 ||  || — || February 13, 2001 || Socorro || LINEAR || FLO || align=right | 2.5 km || 
|-id=382 bgcolor=#fefefe
| 107382 ||  || — || February 13, 2001 || Socorro || LINEAR || — || align=right | 1.8 km || 
|-id=383 bgcolor=#E9E9E9
| 107383 ||  || — || February 15, 2001 || Socorro || LINEAR || — || align=right | 2.3 km || 
|-id=384 bgcolor=#E9E9E9
| 107384 ||  || — || February 15, 2001 || Socorro || LINEAR || ADE || align=right | 5.1 km || 
|-id=385 bgcolor=#fefefe
| 107385 ||  || — || February 15, 2001 || Črni Vrh || Črni Vrh || — || align=right | 2.2 km || 
|-id=386 bgcolor=#fefefe
| 107386 ||  || — || February 13, 2001 || Socorro || LINEAR || — || align=right | 1.5 km || 
|-id=387 bgcolor=#fefefe
| 107387 ||  || — || February 13, 2001 || Socorro || LINEAR || EUT || align=right | 1.1 km || 
|-id=388 bgcolor=#fefefe
| 107388 ||  || — || February 15, 2001 || Socorro || LINEAR || — || align=right | 2.6 km || 
|-id=389 bgcolor=#E9E9E9
| 107389 ||  || — || February 15, 2001 || Socorro || LINEAR || — || align=right | 4.8 km || 
|-id=390 bgcolor=#E9E9E9
| 107390 ||  || — || February 15, 2001 || Socorro || LINEAR || — || align=right | 2.6 km || 
|-id=391 bgcolor=#E9E9E9
| 107391 ||  || — || February 15, 2001 || Socorro || LINEAR || — || align=right | 2.3 km || 
|-id=392 bgcolor=#fefefe
| 107392 ||  || — || February 15, 2001 || Socorro || LINEAR || — || align=right | 2.1 km || 
|-id=393 bgcolor=#d6d6d6
| 107393 Bernacca ||  ||  || February 1, 2001 || Cima Ekar || ADAS || KOR || align=right | 2.7 km || 
|-id=394 bgcolor=#fefefe
| 107394 ||  || — || February 2, 2001 || Cima Ekar || ADAS || NYS || align=right | 2.3 km || 
|-id=395 bgcolor=#E9E9E9
| 107395 ||  || — || February 2, 2001 || Socorro || LINEAR || — || align=right | 4.7 km || 
|-id=396 bgcolor=#E9E9E9
| 107396 Swangin || 2001 DU ||  || February 16, 2001 || Nogales || Tenagra II Obs. || — || align=right | 3.3 km || 
|-id=397 bgcolor=#E9E9E9
| 107397 || 2001 DY || — || February 16, 2001 || Nogales || Tenagra II Obs. || — || align=right | 2.0 km || 
|-id=398 bgcolor=#fefefe
| 107398 ||  || — || February 16, 2001 || Nogales || Tenagra II Obs. || NYS || align=right | 4.2 km || 
|-id=399 bgcolor=#fefefe
| 107399 ||  || — || February 16, 2001 || Kitt Peak || Spacewatch || — || align=right data-sort-value="0.97" | 970 m || 
|-id=400 bgcolor=#fefefe
| 107400 ||  || — || February 16, 2001 || Kitt Peak || Spacewatch || — || align=right | 1.4 km || 
|}

107401–107500 

|-bgcolor=#fefefe
| 107401 ||  || — || February 16, 2001 || Prescott || P. G. Comba || NYS || align=right | 1.2 km || 
|-id=402 bgcolor=#fefefe
| 107402 ||  || — || February 16, 2001 || Socorro || LINEAR || H || align=right | 1.1 km || 
|-id=403 bgcolor=#fefefe
| 107403 ||  || — || February 16, 2001 || Socorro || LINEAR || V || align=right | 1.3 km || 
|-id=404 bgcolor=#fefefe
| 107404 ||  || — || February 16, 2001 || Socorro || LINEAR || — || align=right | 1.5 km || 
|-id=405 bgcolor=#fefefe
| 107405 ||  || — || February 16, 2001 || Socorro || LINEAR || — || align=right | 1.9 km || 
|-id=406 bgcolor=#fefefe
| 107406 ||  || — || February 16, 2001 || Socorro || LINEAR || — || align=right | 1.8 km || 
|-id=407 bgcolor=#fefefe
| 107407 ||  || — || February 17, 2001 || Višnjan Observatory || K. Korlević || NYS || align=right | 1.4 km || 
|-id=408 bgcolor=#fefefe
| 107408 ||  || — || February 16, 2001 || Črni Vrh || Črni Vrh || — || align=right | 1.8 km || 
|-id=409 bgcolor=#fefefe
| 107409 ||  || — || February 16, 2001 || Črni Vrh || Črni Vrh || V || align=right | 1.3 km || 
|-id=410 bgcolor=#fefefe
| 107410 ||  || — || February 17, 2001 || Črni Vrh || Črni Vrh || NYS || align=right | 1.1 km || 
|-id=411 bgcolor=#fefefe
| 107411 ||  || — || February 17, 2001 || Kitt Peak || Spacewatch || MAS || align=right | 1.3 km || 
|-id=412 bgcolor=#fefefe
| 107412 ||  || — || February 16, 2001 || Socorro || LINEAR || H || align=right data-sort-value="0.98" | 980 m || 
|-id=413 bgcolor=#fefefe
| 107413 ||  || — || February 17, 2001 || Socorro || LINEAR || PHO || align=right | 2.1 km || 
|-id=414 bgcolor=#d6d6d6
| 107414 ||  || — || February 16, 2001 || Socorro || LINEAR || — || align=right | 7.8 km || 
|-id=415 bgcolor=#fefefe
| 107415 ||  || — || February 16, 2001 || Socorro || LINEAR || V || align=right | 1.3 km || 
|-id=416 bgcolor=#fefefe
| 107416 ||  || — || February 16, 2001 || Socorro || LINEAR || FLO || align=right | 1.7 km || 
|-id=417 bgcolor=#fefefe
| 107417 ||  || — || February 16, 2001 || Socorro || LINEAR || V || align=right | 1.6 km || 
|-id=418 bgcolor=#fefefe
| 107418 ||  || — || February 17, 2001 || Socorro || LINEAR || ERI || align=right | 2.8 km || 
|-id=419 bgcolor=#E9E9E9
| 107419 ||  || — || February 17, 2001 || Socorro || LINEAR || — || align=right | 2.0 km || 
|-id=420 bgcolor=#fefefe
| 107420 ||  || — || February 17, 2001 || Socorro || LINEAR || FLO || align=right | 1.3 km || 
|-id=421 bgcolor=#fefefe
| 107421 ||  || — || February 17, 2001 || Socorro || LINEAR || MAS || align=right | 1.3 km || 
|-id=422 bgcolor=#E9E9E9
| 107422 ||  || — || February 17, 2001 || Socorro || LINEAR || — || align=right | 1.6 km || 
|-id=423 bgcolor=#fefefe
| 107423 ||  || — || February 17, 2001 || Socorro || LINEAR || NYS || align=right | 1.3 km || 
|-id=424 bgcolor=#E9E9E9
| 107424 ||  || — || February 17, 2001 || Socorro || LINEAR || HOF || align=right | 6.9 km || 
|-id=425 bgcolor=#fefefe
| 107425 ||  || — || February 17, 2001 || Socorro || LINEAR || NYS || align=right | 1.9 km || 
|-id=426 bgcolor=#fefefe
| 107426 ||  || — || February 19, 2001 || Oizumi || T. Kobayashi || — || align=right | 2.5 km || 
|-id=427 bgcolor=#fefefe
| 107427 ||  || — || February 19, 2001 || Oizumi || T. Kobayashi || — || align=right | 1.9 km || 
|-id=428 bgcolor=#fefefe
| 107428 ||  || — || February 19, 2001 || Oizumi || T. Kobayashi || — || align=right | 1.6 km || 
|-id=429 bgcolor=#E9E9E9
| 107429 ||  || — || February 19, 2001 || Oizumi || T. Kobayashi || — || align=right | 2.4 km || 
|-id=430 bgcolor=#E9E9E9
| 107430 ||  || — || February 19, 2001 || Oizumi || T. Kobayashi || — || align=right | 5.7 km || 
|-id=431 bgcolor=#fefefe
| 107431 ||  || — || February 19, 2001 || Socorro || LINEAR || H || align=right | 1.2 km || 
|-id=432 bgcolor=#fefefe
| 107432 ||  || — || February 19, 2001 || Socorro || LINEAR || — || align=right | 1.4 km || 
|-id=433 bgcolor=#fefefe
| 107433 ||  || — || February 16, 2001 || Črni Vrh || Črni Vrh || NYS || align=right | 1.0 km || 
|-id=434 bgcolor=#fefefe
| 107434 ||  || — || February 17, 2001 || Črni Vrh || Črni Vrh || MAS || align=right | 1.8 km || 
|-id=435 bgcolor=#fefefe
| 107435 ||  || — || February 16, 2001 || Socorro || LINEAR || — || align=right | 1.5 km || 
|-id=436 bgcolor=#fefefe
| 107436 ||  || — || February 16, 2001 || Socorro || LINEAR || — || align=right | 3.1 km || 
|-id=437 bgcolor=#fefefe
| 107437 ||  || — || February 16, 2001 || Socorro || LINEAR || — || align=right | 1.6 km || 
|-id=438 bgcolor=#fefefe
| 107438 ||  || — || February 16, 2001 || Socorro || LINEAR || — || align=right | 1.7 km || 
|-id=439 bgcolor=#E9E9E9
| 107439 ||  || — || February 16, 2001 || Socorro || LINEAR || — || align=right | 4.0 km || 
|-id=440 bgcolor=#fefefe
| 107440 ||  || — || February 16, 2001 || Socorro || LINEAR || V || align=right | 1.3 km || 
|-id=441 bgcolor=#E9E9E9
| 107441 ||  || — || February 16, 2001 || Socorro || LINEAR || — || align=right | 1.9 km || 
|-id=442 bgcolor=#E9E9E9
| 107442 ||  || — || February 16, 2001 || Socorro || LINEAR || — || align=right | 2.3 km || 
|-id=443 bgcolor=#fefefe
| 107443 ||  || — || February 16, 2001 || Socorro || LINEAR || V || align=right | 1.8 km || 
|-id=444 bgcolor=#fefefe
| 107444 ||  || — || February 16, 2001 || Socorro || LINEAR || — || align=right | 1.4 km || 
|-id=445 bgcolor=#E9E9E9
| 107445 ||  || — || February 16, 2001 || Socorro || LINEAR || RAF || align=right | 1.9 km || 
|-id=446 bgcolor=#E9E9E9
| 107446 ||  || — || February 16, 2001 || Socorro || LINEAR || — || align=right | 1.9 km || 
|-id=447 bgcolor=#fefefe
| 107447 ||  || — || February 16, 2001 || Socorro || LINEAR || FLO || align=right | 1.7 km || 
|-id=448 bgcolor=#d6d6d6
| 107448 ||  || — || February 16, 2001 || Socorro || LINEAR || LUT || align=right | 8.6 km || 
|-id=449 bgcolor=#fefefe
| 107449 ||  || — || February 16, 2001 || Socorro || LINEAR || — || align=right | 1.6 km || 
|-id=450 bgcolor=#E9E9E9
| 107450 ||  || — || February 16, 2001 || Socorro || LINEAR || MRX || align=right | 1.9 km || 
|-id=451 bgcolor=#fefefe
| 107451 ||  || — || February 16, 2001 || Socorro || LINEAR || — || align=right | 1.4 km || 
|-id=452 bgcolor=#E9E9E9
| 107452 ||  || — || February 16, 2001 || Socorro || LINEAR || — || align=right | 2.1 km || 
|-id=453 bgcolor=#fefefe
| 107453 ||  || — || February 17, 2001 || Socorro || LINEAR || NYS || align=right | 1.2 km || 
|-id=454 bgcolor=#fefefe
| 107454 ||  || — || February 17, 2001 || Socorro || LINEAR || — || align=right | 1.2 km || 
|-id=455 bgcolor=#fefefe
| 107455 ||  || — || February 17, 2001 || Socorro || LINEAR || — || align=right | 1.6 km || 
|-id=456 bgcolor=#fefefe
| 107456 ||  || — || February 17, 2001 || Socorro || LINEAR || NYS || align=right | 1.2 km || 
|-id=457 bgcolor=#E9E9E9
| 107457 ||  || — || February 17, 2001 || Socorro || LINEAR || — || align=right | 2.2 km || 
|-id=458 bgcolor=#fefefe
| 107458 ||  || — || February 17, 2001 || Socorro || LINEAR || NYS || align=right | 1.5 km || 
|-id=459 bgcolor=#E9E9E9
| 107459 ||  || — || February 17, 2001 || Socorro || LINEAR || — || align=right | 4.4 km || 
|-id=460 bgcolor=#fefefe
| 107460 ||  || — || February 17, 2001 || Socorro || LINEAR || MAS || align=right | 1.5 km || 
|-id=461 bgcolor=#fefefe
| 107461 ||  || — || February 17, 2001 || Socorro || LINEAR || V || align=right | 1.1 km || 
|-id=462 bgcolor=#fefefe
| 107462 ||  || — || February 17, 2001 || Socorro || LINEAR || NYS || align=right | 1.3 km || 
|-id=463 bgcolor=#fefefe
| 107463 ||  || — || February 17, 2001 || Socorro || LINEAR || — || align=right | 1.8 km || 
|-id=464 bgcolor=#fefefe
| 107464 ||  || — || February 17, 2001 || Socorro || LINEAR || — || align=right | 1.2 km || 
|-id=465 bgcolor=#E9E9E9
| 107465 ||  || — || February 17, 2001 || Socorro || LINEAR || MRX || align=right | 2.7 km || 
|-id=466 bgcolor=#E9E9E9
| 107466 ||  || — || February 17, 2001 || Socorro || LINEAR || — || align=right | 3.2 km || 
|-id=467 bgcolor=#fefefe
| 107467 ||  || — || February 17, 2001 || Socorro || LINEAR || MAS || align=right | 2.0 km || 
|-id=468 bgcolor=#E9E9E9
| 107468 ||  || — || February 17, 2001 || Socorro || LINEAR || — || align=right | 1.9 km || 
|-id=469 bgcolor=#fefefe
| 107469 ||  || — || February 17, 2001 || Socorro || LINEAR || ERI || align=right | 3.9 km || 
|-id=470 bgcolor=#fefefe
| 107470 ||  || — || February 17, 2001 || Socorro || LINEAR || — || align=right | 2.2 km || 
|-id=471 bgcolor=#fefefe
| 107471 ||  || — || February 17, 2001 || Socorro || LINEAR || NYS || align=right | 1.4 km || 
|-id=472 bgcolor=#fefefe
| 107472 ||  || — || February 17, 2001 || Socorro || LINEAR || NYS || align=right | 1.4 km || 
|-id=473 bgcolor=#fefefe
| 107473 ||  || — || February 17, 2001 || Socorro || LINEAR || — || align=right | 1.9 km || 
|-id=474 bgcolor=#E9E9E9
| 107474 ||  || — || February 17, 2001 || Socorro || LINEAR || — || align=right | 3.7 km || 
|-id=475 bgcolor=#fefefe
| 107475 ||  || — || February 17, 2001 || Socorro || LINEAR || — || align=right | 2.1 km || 
|-id=476 bgcolor=#E9E9E9
| 107476 ||  || — || February 17, 2001 || Socorro || LINEAR || — || align=right | 4.0 km || 
|-id=477 bgcolor=#fefefe
| 107477 ||  || — || February 17, 2001 || Socorro || LINEAR || — || align=right | 1.9 km || 
|-id=478 bgcolor=#fefefe
| 107478 ||  || — || February 19, 2001 || Socorro || LINEAR || — || align=right | 1.7 km || 
|-id=479 bgcolor=#fefefe
| 107479 ||  || — || February 19, 2001 || Socorro || LINEAR || — || align=right | 1.4 km || 
|-id=480 bgcolor=#E9E9E9
| 107480 ||  || — || February 19, 2001 || Socorro || LINEAR || — || align=right | 1.6 km || 
|-id=481 bgcolor=#fefefe
| 107481 ||  || — || February 19, 2001 || Socorro || LINEAR || MAS || align=right | 1.4 km || 
|-id=482 bgcolor=#E9E9E9
| 107482 ||  || — || February 19, 2001 || Socorro || LINEAR || — || align=right | 2.0 km || 
|-id=483 bgcolor=#E9E9E9
| 107483 ||  || — || February 19, 2001 || Socorro || LINEAR || HEN || align=right | 2.1 km || 
|-id=484 bgcolor=#E9E9E9
| 107484 ||  || — || February 19, 2001 || Socorro || LINEAR || RAF || align=right | 4.1 km || 
|-id=485 bgcolor=#E9E9E9
| 107485 ||  || — || February 19, 2001 || Socorro || LINEAR || — || align=right | 1.6 km || 
|-id=486 bgcolor=#E9E9E9
| 107486 ||  || — || February 19, 2001 || Socorro || LINEAR || MAR || align=right | 2.2 km || 
|-id=487 bgcolor=#fefefe
| 107487 ||  || — || February 19, 2001 || Socorro || LINEAR || NYS || align=right | 1.5 km || 
|-id=488 bgcolor=#E9E9E9
| 107488 ||  || — || February 19, 2001 || Socorro || LINEAR || — || align=right | 1.8 km || 
|-id=489 bgcolor=#fefefe
| 107489 ||  || — || February 19, 2001 || Socorro || LINEAR || — || align=right | 1.7 km || 
|-id=490 bgcolor=#E9E9E9
| 107490 ||  || — || February 19, 2001 || Socorro || LINEAR || — || align=right | 5.3 km || 
|-id=491 bgcolor=#d6d6d6
| 107491 ||  || — || February 19, 2001 || Socorro || LINEAR || — || align=right | 5.2 km || 
|-id=492 bgcolor=#fefefe
| 107492 ||  || — || February 19, 2001 || Socorro || LINEAR || FLO || align=right | 1.3 km || 
|-id=493 bgcolor=#fefefe
| 107493 ||  || — || February 19, 2001 || Socorro || LINEAR || — || align=right | 1.8 km || 
|-id=494 bgcolor=#fefefe
| 107494 ||  || — || February 19, 2001 || Socorro || LINEAR || — || align=right | 1.4 km || 
|-id=495 bgcolor=#fefefe
| 107495 ||  || — || February 19, 2001 || Socorro || LINEAR || NYS || align=right | 1.4 km || 
|-id=496 bgcolor=#fefefe
| 107496 ||  || — || February 19, 2001 || Socorro || LINEAR || MAS || align=right | 1.6 km || 
|-id=497 bgcolor=#fefefe
| 107497 ||  || — || February 19, 2001 || Socorro || LINEAR || V || align=right | 1.2 km || 
|-id=498 bgcolor=#fefefe
| 107498 ||  || — || February 19, 2001 || Socorro || LINEAR || MAS || align=right | 1.5 km || 
|-id=499 bgcolor=#E9E9E9
| 107499 ||  || — || February 19, 2001 || Socorro || LINEAR || — || align=right | 3.5 km || 
|-id=500 bgcolor=#fefefe
| 107500 ||  || — || February 19, 2001 || Socorro || LINEAR || — || align=right | 1.5 km || 
|}

107501–107600 

|-bgcolor=#fefefe
| 107501 ||  || — || February 19, 2001 || Socorro || LINEAR || — || align=right | 1.3 km || 
|-id=502 bgcolor=#fefefe
| 107502 ||  || — || February 20, 2001 || Socorro || LINEAR || H || align=right | 1.2 km || 
|-id=503 bgcolor=#fefefe
| 107503 ||  || — || February 16, 2001 || Socorro || LINEAR || — || align=right | 2.1 km || 
|-id=504 bgcolor=#fefefe
| 107504 ||  || — || February 16, 2001 || Socorro || LINEAR || — || align=right | 1.3 km || 
|-id=505 bgcolor=#fefefe
| 107505 ||  || — || February 16, 2001 || Socorro || LINEAR || FLO || align=right | 1.5 km || 
|-id=506 bgcolor=#fefefe
| 107506 ||  || — || February 16, 2001 || Socorro || LINEAR || — || align=right | 1.8 km || 
|-id=507 bgcolor=#fefefe
| 107507 ||  || — || February 16, 2001 || Socorro || LINEAR || — || align=right | 1.9 km || 
|-id=508 bgcolor=#fefefe
| 107508 ||  || — || February 16, 2001 || Socorro || LINEAR || V || align=right | 1.5 km || 
|-id=509 bgcolor=#fefefe
| 107509 ||  || — || February 16, 2001 || Socorro || LINEAR || — || align=right | 1.5 km || 
|-id=510 bgcolor=#E9E9E9
| 107510 ||  || — || February 16, 2001 || Socorro || LINEAR || — || align=right | 2.6 km || 
|-id=511 bgcolor=#fefefe
| 107511 ||  || — || February 16, 2001 || Socorro || LINEAR || — || align=right | 1.7 km || 
|-id=512 bgcolor=#E9E9E9
| 107512 ||  || — || February 17, 2001 || Socorro || LINEAR || — || align=right | 2.8 km || 
|-id=513 bgcolor=#fefefe
| 107513 ||  || — || February 20, 2001 || Socorro || LINEAR || V || align=right | 1.3 km || 
|-id=514 bgcolor=#fefefe
| 107514 ||  || — || February 20, 2001 || Črni Vrh || Črni Vrh || — || align=right | 1.8 km || 
|-id=515 bgcolor=#fefefe
| 107515 ||  || — || February 21, 2001 || Kitt Peak || Spacewatch || — || align=right | 1.5 km || 
|-id=516 bgcolor=#fefefe
| 107516 ||  || — || February 21, 2001 || Kitt Peak || Spacewatch || — || align=right | 1.3 km || 
|-id=517 bgcolor=#fefefe
| 107517 ||  || — || February 19, 2001 || Oizumi || T. Kobayashi || — || align=right | 1.6 km || 
|-id=518 bgcolor=#fefefe
| 107518 ||  || — || February 16, 2001 || Kitt Peak || Spacewatch || MAS || align=right | 1.5 km || 
|-id=519 bgcolor=#fefefe
| 107519 ||  || — || February 17, 2001 || Kitt Peak || Spacewatch || MAS || align=right | 1.2 km || 
|-id=520 bgcolor=#fefefe
| 107520 ||  || — || February 17, 2001 || Haleakala || NEAT || — || align=right | 1.8 km || 
|-id=521 bgcolor=#fefefe
| 107521 ||  || — || February 19, 2001 || Socorro || LINEAR || NYS || align=right | 1.3 km || 
|-id=522 bgcolor=#E9E9E9
| 107522 ||  || — || February 19, 2001 || Socorro || LINEAR || EUN || align=right | 2.7 km || 
|-id=523 bgcolor=#fefefe
| 107523 ||  || — || February 19, 2001 || Socorro || LINEAR || FLO || align=right | 1.6 km || 
|-id=524 bgcolor=#fefefe
| 107524 ||  || — || February 19, 2001 || Socorro || LINEAR || — || align=right | 1.3 km || 
|-id=525 bgcolor=#fefefe
| 107525 ||  || — || February 19, 2001 || Socorro || LINEAR || — || align=right | 2.0 km || 
|-id=526 bgcolor=#fefefe
| 107526 ||  || — || February 19, 2001 || Socorro || LINEAR || NYS || align=right | 1.2 km || 
|-id=527 bgcolor=#fefefe
| 107527 ||  || — || February 19, 2001 || Socorro || LINEAR || NYS || align=right | 1.2 km || 
|-id=528 bgcolor=#fefefe
| 107528 ||  || — || February 19, 2001 || Socorro || LINEAR || NYS || align=right | 1.2 km || 
|-id=529 bgcolor=#fefefe
| 107529 ||  || — || February 19, 2001 || Socorro || LINEAR || — || align=right | 1.3 km || 
|-id=530 bgcolor=#fefefe
| 107530 ||  || — || February 19, 2001 || Socorro || LINEAR || NYS || align=right | 1.2 km || 
|-id=531 bgcolor=#E9E9E9
| 107531 ||  || — || February 19, 2001 || Socorro || LINEAR || — || align=right | 2.6 km || 
|-id=532 bgcolor=#fefefe
| 107532 ||  || — || February 19, 2001 || Socorro || LINEAR || — || align=right | 2.2 km || 
|-id=533 bgcolor=#E9E9E9
| 107533 ||  || — || February 19, 2001 || Socorro || LINEAR || — || align=right | 2.1 km || 
|-id=534 bgcolor=#fefefe
| 107534 ||  || — || February 19, 2001 || Socorro || LINEAR || FLO || align=right | 1.5 km || 
|-id=535 bgcolor=#fefefe
| 107535 ||  || — || February 19, 2001 || Socorro || LINEAR || V || align=right | 1.4 km || 
|-id=536 bgcolor=#E9E9E9
| 107536 ||  || — || February 19, 2001 || Socorro || LINEAR || — || align=right | 1.3 km || 
|-id=537 bgcolor=#E9E9E9
| 107537 ||  || — || February 19, 2001 || Socorro || LINEAR || — || align=right | 5.4 km || 
|-id=538 bgcolor=#fefefe
| 107538 ||  || — || February 19, 2001 || Socorro || LINEAR || — || align=right | 3.1 km || 
|-id=539 bgcolor=#fefefe
| 107539 ||  || — || February 19, 2001 || Socorro || LINEAR || — || align=right | 3.8 km || 
|-id=540 bgcolor=#fefefe
| 107540 ||  || — || February 19, 2001 || Socorro || LINEAR || NYS || align=right | 1.5 km || 
|-id=541 bgcolor=#E9E9E9
| 107541 ||  || — || February 19, 2001 || Socorro || LINEAR || EUN || align=right | 2.6 km || 
|-id=542 bgcolor=#E9E9E9
| 107542 ||  || — || February 19, 2001 || Socorro || LINEAR || — || align=right | 3.9 km || 
|-id=543 bgcolor=#fefefe
| 107543 ||  || — || February 19, 2001 || Socorro || LINEAR || V || align=right | 1.3 km || 
|-id=544 bgcolor=#fefefe
| 107544 ||  || — || February 19, 2001 || Socorro || LINEAR || KLI || align=right | 5.9 km || 
|-id=545 bgcolor=#E9E9E9
| 107545 ||  || — || February 19, 2001 || Socorro || LINEAR || — || align=right | 4.2 km || 
|-id=546 bgcolor=#fefefe
| 107546 ||  || — || February 19, 2001 || Socorro || LINEAR || — || align=right | 2.9 km || 
|-id=547 bgcolor=#fefefe
| 107547 ||  || — || February 19, 2001 || Socorro || LINEAR || FLO || align=right | 1.2 km || 
|-id=548 bgcolor=#E9E9E9
| 107548 ||  || — || February 19, 2001 || Socorro || LINEAR || RAF || align=right | 1.8 km || 
|-id=549 bgcolor=#E9E9E9
| 107549 ||  || — || February 19, 2001 || Socorro || LINEAR || — || align=right | 1.6 km || 
|-id=550 bgcolor=#fefefe
| 107550 ||  || — || February 19, 2001 || Socorro || LINEAR || — || align=right | 4.3 km || 
|-id=551 bgcolor=#fefefe
| 107551 ||  || — || February 19, 2001 || Socorro || LINEAR || — || align=right | 1.8 km || 
|-id=552 bgcolor=#fefefe
| 107552 ||  || — || February 22, 2001 || Kitt Peak || Spacewatch || MAS || align=right | 1.4 km || 
|-id=553 bgcolor=#fefefe
| 107553 ||  || — || February 22, 2001 || Kitt Peak || Spacewatch || — || align=right | 1.2 km || 
|-id=554 bgcolor=#E9E9E9
| 107554 ||  || — || February 16, 2001 || Socorro || LINEAR || — || align=right | 2.4 km || 
|-id=555 bgcolor=#fefefe
| 107555 ||  || — || February 19, 2001 || Ondřejov || P. Pravec, P. Kušnirák || — || align=right | 1.5 km || 
|-id=556 bgcolor=#E9E9E9
| 107556 ||  || — || February 26, 2001 || Oizumi || T. Kobayashi || — || align=right | 2.0 km || 
|-id=557 bgcolor=#E9E9E9
| 107557 ||  || — || February 21, 2001 || Kitt Peak || Spacewatch || — || align=right | 2.3 km || 
|-id=558 bgcolor=#E9E9E9
| 107558 ||  || — || February 23, 2001 || Cerro Tololo || DLS || — || align=right | 2.3 km || 
|-id=559 bgcolor=#fefefe
| 107559 ||  || — || February 22, 2001 || Nogales || Tenagra II Obs. || — || align=right | 1.3 km || 
|-id=560 bgcolor=#fefefe
| 107560 ||  || — || February 22, 2001 || Nogales || Tenagra II Obs. || FLO || align=right | 1.1 km || 
|-id=561 bgcolor=#fefefe
| 107561 Quinn ||  ||  || February 28, 2001 || Badlands || R. Dyvig || NYS || align=right | 1.2 km || 
|-id=562 bgcolor=#E9E9E9
| 107562 ||  || — || February 16, 2001 || Socorro || LINEAR || PAD || align=right | 4.5 km || 
|-id=563 bgcolor=#E9E9E9
| 107563 ||  || — || February 16, 2001 || Socorro || LINEAR || — || align=right | 2.1 km || 
|-id=564 bgcolor=#E9E9E9
| 107564 ||  || — || February 27, 2001 || Kitt Peak || Spacewatch || — || align=right | 1.7 km || 
|-id=565 bgcolor=#fefefe
| 107565 ||  || — || February 27, 2001 || Kitt Peak || Spacewatch || — || align=right | 1.5 km || 
|-id=566 bgcolor=#E9E9E9
| 107566 ||  || — || February 27, 2001 || Kitt Peak || Spacewatch || — || align=right | 2.6 km || 
|-id=567 bgcolor=#fefefe
| 107567 ||  || — || February 27, 2001 || Kleť || Kleť Obs. || — || align=right | 1.5 km || 
|-id=568 bgcolor=#d6d6d6
| 107568 ||  || — || February 22, 2001 || Socorro || LINEAR || ALA || align=right | 6.6 km || 
|-id=569 bgcolor=#fefefe
| 107569 ||  || — || February 22, 2001 || Socorro || LINEAR || NYS || align=right | 1.1 km || 
|-id=570 bgcolor=#d6d6d6
| 107570 ||  || — || February 22, 2001 || Socorro || LINEAR || ALA || align=right | 6.8 km || 
|-id=571 bgcolor=#d6d6d6
| 107571 ||  || — || February 22, 2001 || Socorro || LINEAR || — || align=right | 5.7 km || 
|-id=572 bgcolor=#E9E9E9
| 107572 ||  || — || February 20, 2001 || Socorro || LINEAR || — || align=right | 1.9 km || 
|-id=573 bgcolor=#fefefe
| 107573 ||  || — || February 19, 2001 || Anderson Mesa || LONEOS || — || align=right | 1.6 km || 
|-id=574 bgcolor=#fefefe
| 107574 ||  || — || February 19, 2001 || Anderson Mesa || LONEOS || MAS || align=right | 1.2 km || 
|-id=575 bgcolor=#fefefe
| 107575 ||  || — || February 19, 2001 || Socorro || LINEAR || — || align=right | 1.4 km || 
|-id=576 bgcolor=#fefefe
| 107576 ||  || — || February 19, 2001 || Socorro || LINEAR || — || align=right | 1.8 km || 
|-id=577 bgcolor=#fefefe
| 107577 ||  || — || February 17, 2001 || Socorro || LINEAR || NYS || align=right | 1.4 km || 
|-id=578 bgcolor=#E9E9E9
| 107578 ||  || — || February 17, 2001 || Socorro || LINEAR || — || align=right | 2.5 km || 
|-id=579 bgcolor=#fefefe
| 107579 ||  || — || February 17, 2001 || Socorro || LINEAR || — || align=right | 5.3 km || 
|-id=580 bgcolor=#d6d6d6
| 107580 ||  || — || February 17, 2001 || Socorro || LINEAR || — || align=right | 4.5 km || 
|-id=581 bgcolor=#fefefe
| 107581 ||  || — || February 17, 2001 || Socorro || LINEAR || NYS || align=right | 1.3 km || 
|-id=582 bgcolor=#fefefe
| 107582 ||  || — || February 17, 2001 || Socorro || LINEAR || NYS || align=right | 1.1 km || 
|-id=583 bgcolor=#fefefe
| 107583 ||  || — || February 17, 2001 || Socorro || LINEAR || — || align=right | 1.3 km || 
|-id=584 bgcolor=#fefefe
| 107584 ||  || — || February 17, 2001 || Socorro || LINEAR || — || align=right | 2.0 km || 
|-id=585 bgcolor=#fefefe
| 107585 ||  || — || February 17, 2001 || Socorro || LINEAR || V || align=right | 1.8 km || 
|-id=586 bgcolor=#fefefe
| 107586 ||  || — || February 16, 2001 || Socorro || LINEAR || — || align=right | 2.1 km || 
|-id=587 bgcolor=#fefefe
| 107587 ||  || — || February 16, 2001 || Kitt Peak || Spacewatch || V || align=right | 1.3 km || 
|-id=588 bgcolor=#fefefe
| 107588 ||  || — || February 16, 2001 || Socorro || LINEAR || — || align=right | 2.3 km || 
|-id=589 bgcolor=#fefefe
| 107589 ||  || — || February 16, 2001 || Socorro || LINEAR || FLO || align=right | 1.9 km || 
|-id=590 bgcolor=#fefefe
| 107590 ||  || — || February 16, 2001 || Socorro || LINEAR || — || align=right | 2.1 km || 
|-id=591 bgcolor=#fefefe
| 107591 ||  || — || February 16, 2001 || Socorro || LINEAR || — || align=right | 2.0 km || 
|-id=592 bgcolor=#fefefe
| 107592 ||  || — || February 16, 2001 || Socorro || LINEAR || ERI || align=right | 3.2 km || 
|-id=593 bgcolor=#fefefe
| 107593 ||  || — || February 16, 2001 || Socorro || LINEAR || — || align=right | 4.3 km || 
|-id=594 bgcolor=#E9E9E9
| 107594 ||  || — || February 16, 2001 || Socorro || LINEAR || — || align=right | 2.7 km || 
|-id=595 bgcolor=#fefefe
| 107595 ||  || — || February 16, 2001 || Socorro || LINEAR || V || align=right | 1.3 km || 
|-id=596 bgcolor=#E9E9E9
| 107596 ||  || — || February 16, 2001 || Anderson Mesa || LONEOS || — || align=right | 4.1 km || 
|-id=597 bgcolor=#fefefe
| 107597 ||  || — || February 16, 2001 || Anderson Mesa || LONEOS || V || align=right | 1.1 km || 
|-id=598 bgcolor=#fefefe
| 107598 ||  || — || February 16, 2001 || Anderson Mesa || LONEOS || NYS || align=right | 1.0 km || 
|-id=599 bgcolor=#fefefe
| 107599 ||  || — || February 19, 2001 || Socorro || LINEAR || — || align=right | 1.7 km || 
|-id=600 bgcolor=#E9E9E9
| 107600 || 2001 EO || — || March 2, 2001 || Desert Beaver || W. K. Y. Yeung || — || align=right | 2.2 km || 
|}

107601–107700 

|-bgcolor=#E9E9E9
| 107601 || 2001 EW || — || March 2, 2001 || Haleakala || NEAT || — || align=right | 4.4 km || 
|-id=602 bgcolor=#fefefe
| 107602 ||  || — || March 1, 2001 || Socorro || LINEAR || — || align=right | 1.5 km || 
|-id=603 bgcolor=#E9E9E9
| 107603 ||  || — || March 1, 2001 || Socorro || LINEAR || KON || align=right | 5.0 km || 
|-id=604 bgcolor=#E9E9E9
| 107604 ||  || — || March 3, 2001 || Socorro || LINEAR || — || align=right | 1.5 km || 
|-id=605 bgcolor=#fefefe
| 107605 ||  || — || March 3, 2001 || Socorro || LINEAR || — || align=right | 1.7 km || 
|-id=606 bgcolor=#fefefe
| 107606 ||  || — || March 2, 2001 || Anderson Mesa || LONEOS || — || align=right | 1.1 km || 
|-id=607 bgcolor=#fefefe
| 107607 ||  || — || March 2, 2001 || Anderson Mesa || LONEOS || — || align=right | 2.7 km || 
|-id=608 bgcolor=#fefefe
| 107608 ||  || — || March 2, 2001 || Anderson Mesa || LONEOS || MAS || align=right | 1.3 km || 
|-id=609 bgcolor=#fefefe
| 107609 ||  || — || March 2, 2001 || Anderson Mesa || LONEOS || — || align=right | 3.5 km || 
|-id=610 bgcolor=#fefefe
| 107610 ||  || — || March 2, 2001 || Anderson Mesa || LONEOS || NYS || align=right | 1.2 km || 
|-id=611 bgcolor=#E9E9E9
| 107611 ||  || — || March 2, 2001 || Anderson Mesa || LONEOS || — || align=right | 2.3 km || 
|-id=612 bgcolor=#fefefe
| 107612 ||  || — || March 2, 2001 || Anderson Mesa || LONEOS || NYS || align=right | 1.1 km || 
|-id=613 bgcolor=#fefefe
| 107613 ||  || — || March 2, 2001 || Anderson Mesa || LONEOS || — || align=right | 1.1 km || 
|-id=614 bgcolor=#fefefe
| 107614 ||  || — || March 2, 2001 || Anderson Mesa || LONEOS || NYS || align=right | 1.3 km || 
|-id=615 bgcolor=#fefefe
| 107615 ||  || — || March 2, 2001 || Anderson Mesa || LONEOS || — || align=right | 1.3 km || 
|-id=616 bgcolor=#fefefe
| 107616 ||  || — || March 2, 2001 || Anderson Mesa || LONEOS || V || align=right | 1.6 km || 
|-id=617 bgcolor=#fefefe
| 107617 ||  || — || March 2, 2001 || Anderson Mesa || LONEOS || — || align=right | 1.6 km || 
|-id=618 bgcolor=#fefefe
| 107618 ||  || — || March 2, 2001 || Anderson Mesa || LONEOS || — || align=right | 1.4 km || 
|-id=619 bgcolor=#fefefe
| 107619 ||  || — || March 2, 2001 || Anderson Mesa || LONEOS || NYS || align=right | 1.3 km || 
|-id=620 bgcolor=#fefefe
| 107620 ||  || — || March 2, 2001 || Anderson Mesa || LONEOS || NYS || align=right | 1.4 km || 
|-id=621 bgcolor=#fefefe
| 107621 ||  || — || March 2, 2001 || Anderson Mesa || LONEOS || NYS || align=right | 1.6 km || 
|-id=622 bgcolor=#E9E9E9
| 107622 ||  || — || March 2, 2001 || Anderson Mesa || LONEOS || — || align=right | 2.9 km || 
|-id=623 bgcolor=#E9E9E9
| 107623 ||  || — || March 2, 2001 || Anderson Mesa || LONEOS || MIT || align=right | 6.9 km || 
|-id=624 bgcolor=#E9E9E9
| 107624 ||  || — || March 2, 2001 || Anderson Mesa || LONEOS || — || align=right | 3.1 km || 
|-id=625 bgcolor=#E9E9E9
| 107625 ||  || — || March 2, 2001 || Anderson Mesa || LONEOS || — || align=right | 2.2 km || 
|-id=626 bgcolor=#E9E9E9
| 107626 ||  || — || March 2, 2001 || Anderson Mesa || LONEOS || — || align=right | 3.7 km || 
|-id=627 bgcolor=#fefefe
| 107627 ||  || — || March 2, 2001 || Anderson Mesa || LONEOS || V || align=right | 1.4 km || 
|-id=628 bgcolor=#fefefe
| 107628 ||  || — || March 2, 2001 || Haleakala || NEAT || MAS || align=right | 1.4 km || 
|-id=629 bgcolor=#E9E9E9
| 107629 ||  || — || March 2, 2001 || Haleakala || NEAT || HNS || align=right | 2.8 km || 
|-id=630 bgcolor=#E9E9E9
| 107630 ||  || — || March 3, 2001 || Socorro || LINEAR || — || align=right | 3.1 km || 
|-id=631 bgcolor=#fefefe
| 107631 ||  || — || March 3, 2001 || Socorro || LINEAR || MAS || align=right | 1.2 km || 
|-id=632 bgcolor=#E9E9E9
| 107632 ||  || — || March 3, 2001 || Socorro || LINEAR || — || align=right | 2.0 km || 
|-id=633 bgcolor=#fefefe
| 107633 ||  || — || March 3, 2001 || Socorro || LINEAR || — || align=right | 1.6 km || 
|-id=634 bgcolor=#E9E9E9
| 107634 ||  || — || March 3, 2001 || Socorro || LINEAR || — || align=right | 1.9 km || 
|-id=635 bgcolor=#E9E9E9
| 107635 ||  || — || March 3, 2001 || Socorro || LINEAR || — || align=right | 2.2 km || 
|-id=636 bgcolor=#fefefe
| 107636 ||  || — || March 15, 2001 || Kitt Peak || Spacewatch || H || align=right | 1.4 km || 
|-id=637 bgcolor=#E9E9E9
| 107637 ||  || — || March 15, 2001 || Kitt Peak || Spacewatch || HNS || align=right | 2.8 km || 
|-id=638 bgcolor=#E9E9E9
| 107638 Wendyfreedman ||  ||  || March 15, 2001 || Junk Bond || D. Healy || KON || align=right | 4.3 km || 
|-id=639 bgcolor=#E9E9E9
| 107639 ||  || — || March 13, 2001 || Socorro || LINEAR || — || align=right | 2.4 km || 
|-id=640 bgcolor=#fefefe
| 107640 ||  || — || March 14, 2001 || Socorro || LINEAR || H || align=right | 1.5 km || 
|-id=641 bgcolor=#d6d6d6
| 107641 ||  || — || March 15, 2001 || Haleakala || NEAT || — || align=right | 6.7 km || 
|-id=642 bgcolor=#fefefe
| 107642 ||  || — || March 3, 2001 || Socorro || LINEAR || H || align=right | 1.5 km || 
|-id=643 bgcolor=#E9E9E9
| 107643 ||  || — || March 15, 2001 || Oizumi || T. Kobayashi || EUN || align=right | 2.9 km || 
|-id=644 bgcolor=#fefefe
| 107644 ||  || — || March 15, 2001 || Kitt Peak || Spacewatch || — || align=right | 1.3 km || 
|-id=645 bgcolor=#fefefe
| 107645 ||  || — || March 14, 2001 || Haleakala || NEAT || V || align=right | 1.6 km || 
|-id=646 bgcolor=#fefefe
| 107646 ||  || — || March 15, 2001 || Anderson Mesa || LONEOS || NYS || align=right | 2.8 km || 
|-id=647 bgcolor=#fefefe
| 107647 ||  || — || March 15, 2001 || Anderson Mesa || LONEOS || FLO || align=right | 1.4 km || 
|-id=648 bgcolor=#E9E9E9
| 107648 ||  || — || March 15, 2001 || Anderson Mesa || LONEOS || — || align=right | 2.0 km || 
|-id=649 bgcolor=#fefefe
| 107649 ||  || — || March 15, 2001 || Anderson Mesa || LONEOS || NYS || align=right | 1.4 km || 
|-id=650 bgcolor=#fefefe
| 107650 ||  || — || March 15, 2001 || Anderson Mesa || LONEOS || CIM || align=right | 4.6 km || 
|-id=651 bgcolor=#fefefe
| 107651 ||  || — || March 15, 2001 || Anderson Mesa || LONEOS || — || align=right | 1.5 km || 
|-id=652 bgcolor=#fefefe
| 107652 ||  || — || March 15, 2001 || Haleakala || NEAT || — || align=right | 1.9 km || 
|-id=653 bgcolor=#E9E9E9
| 107653 ||  || — || March 15, 2001 || Kitt Peak || Spacewatch || — || align=right | 5.5 km || 
|-id=654 bgcolor=#fefefe
| 107654 ||  || — || March 15, 2001 || Haleakala || NEAT || — || align=right | 1.5 km || 
|-id=655 bgcolor=#fefefe
| 107655 ||  || — || March 15, 2001 || Haleakala || NEAT || — || align=right | 1.9 km || 
|-id=656 bgcolor=#fefefe
| 107656 ||  || — || March 15, 2001 || Kitt Peak || Spacewatch || NYS || align=right | 1.4 km || 
|-id=657 bgcolor=#E9E9E9
| 107657 ||  || — || March 15, 2001 || Socorro || LINEAR || — || align=right | 3.6 km || 
|-id=658 bgcolor=#fefefe
| 107658 ||  || — || March 15, 2001 || Anderson Mesa || LONEOS || — || align=right | 1.9 km || 
|-id=659 bgcolor=#d6d6d6
| 107659 ||  || — || March 4, 2001 || Socorro || LINEAR || URS || align=right | 7.3 km || 
|-id=660 bgcolor=#fefefe
| 107660 || 2001 FH || — || March 16, 2001 || Haleakala || NEAT || FLO || align=right | 1.9 km || 
|-id=661 bgcolor=#fefefe
| 107661 ||  || — || March 16, 2001 || Socorro || LINEAR || — || align=right | 3.1 km || 
|-id=662 bgcolor=#fefefe
| 107662 ||  || — || March 17, 2001 || Socorro || LINEAR || — || align=right | 2.0 km || 
|-id=663 bgcolor=#fefefe
| 107663 ||  || — || March 18, 2001 || Socorro || LINEAR || — || align=right | 1.6 km || 
|-id=664 bgcolor=#E9E9E9
| 107664 ||  || — || March 18, 2001 || Socorro || LINEAR || — || align=right | 1.9 km || 
|-id=665 bgcolor=#E9E9E9
| 107665 ||  || — || March 18, 2001 || Socorro || LINEAR || — || align=right | 2.8 km || 
|-id=666 bgcolor=#fefefe
| 107666 ||  || — || March 18, 2001 || Socorro || LINEAR || ERI || align=right | 2.8 km || 
|-id=667 bgcolor=#fefefe
| 107667 ||  || — || March 18, 2001 || Socorro || LINEAR || — || align=right | 1.6 km || 
|-id=668 bgcolor=#fefefe
| 107668 ||  || — || March 18, 2001 || Socorro || LINEAR || H || align=right | 2.0 km || 
|-id=669 bgcolor=#fefefe
| 107669 ||  || — || March 18, 2001 || Socorro || LINEAR || ERI || align=right | 4.1 km || 
|-id=670 bgcolor=#fefefe
| 107670 ||  || — || March 18, 2001 || Socorro || LINEAR || MAS || align=right | 1.9 km || 
|-id=671 bgcolor=#E9E9E9
| 107671 ||  || — || March 18, 2001 || Socorro || LINEAR || — || align=right | 3.3 km || 
|-id=672 bgcolor=#fefefe
| 107672 ||  || — || March 19, 2001 || Socorro || LINEAR || NYS || align=right | 1.4 km || 
|-id=673 bgcolor=#FA8072
| 107673 ||  || — || March 19, 2001 || Socorro || LINEAR || — || align=right | 2.2 km || 
|-id=674 bgcolor=#E9E9E9
| 107674 ||  || — || March 19, 2001 || Socorro || LINEAR || — || align=right | 4.7 km || 
|-id=675 bgcolor=#fefefe
| 107675 ||  || — || March 20, 2001 || Haleakala || NEAT || — || align=right | 1.5 km || 
|-id=676 bgcolor=#fefefe
| 107676 ||  || — || March 17, 2001 || Gnosca || S. Sposetti || MAS || align=right | 1.4 km || 
|-id=677 bgcolor=#fefefe
| 107677 ||  || — || March 19, 2001 || Anderson Mesa || LONEOS || V || align=right | 1.5 km || 
|-id=678 bgcolor=#E9E9E9
| 107678 ||  || — || March 19, 2001 || Anderson Mesa || LONEOS || — || align=right | 1.7 km || 
|-id=679 bgcolor=#E9E9E9
| 107679 ||  || — || March 19, 2001 || Anderson Mesa || LONEOS || HENfast || align=right | 2.1 km || 
|-id=680 bgcolor=#fefefe
| 107680 ||  || — || March 19, 2001 || Anderson Mesa || LONEOS || V || align=right | 1.3 km || 
|-id=681 bgcolor=#d6d6d6
| 107681 ||  || — || March 19, 2001 || Anderson Mesa || LONEOS || EOS || align=right | 5.1 km || 
|-id=682 bgcolor=#E9E9E9
| 107682 ||  || — || March 19, 2001 || Anderson Mesa || LONEOS || — || align=right | 2.0 km || 
|-id=683 bgcolor=#E9E9E9
| 107683 ||  || — || March 19, 2001 || Anderson Mesa || LONEOS || — || align=right | 2.5 km || 
|-id=684 bgcolor=#fefefe
| 107684 ||  || — || March 19, 2001 || Anderson Mesa || LONEOS || NYS || align=right | 1.5 km || 
|-id=685 bgcolor=#fefefe
| 107685 ||  || — || March 19, 2001 || Anderson Mesa || LONEOS || NYS || align=right | 1.3 km || 
|-id=686 bgcolor=#E9E9E9
| 107686 ||  || — || March 19, 2001 || Anderson Mesa || LONEOS || HOF || align=right | 5.4 km || 
|-id=687 bgcolor=#E9E9E9
| 107687 ||  || — || March 19, 2001 || Anderson Mesa || LONEOS || — || align=right | 1.2 km || 
|-id=688 bgcolor=#E9E9E9
| 107688 ||  || — || March 19, 2001 || Anderson Mesa || LONEOS || MAR || align=right | 1.8 km || 
|-id=689 bgcolor=#fefefe
| 107689 ||  || — || March 19, 2001 || Anderson Mesa || LONEOS || NYS || align=right | 1.5 km || 
|-id=690 bgcolor=#d6d6d6
| 107690 ||  || — || March 19, 2001 || Anderson Mesa || LONEOS || 7:4 || align=right | 6.0 km || 
|-id=691 bgcolor=#fefefe
| 107691 ||  || — || March 19, 2001 || Anderson Mesa || LONEOS || V || align=right | 1.2 km || 
|-id=692 bgcolor=#E9E9E9
| 107692 ||  || — || March 19, 2001 || Anderson Mesa || LONEOS || — || align=right | 1.9 km || 
|-id=693 bgcolor=#fefefe
| 107693 ||  || — || March 19, 2001 || Anderson Mesa || LONEOS || MAS || align=right | 1.9 km || 
|-id=694 bgcolor=#fefefe
| 107694 ||  || — || March 19, 2001 || Anderson Mesa || LONEOS || FLO || align=right | 1.7 km || 
|-id=695 bgcolor=#E9E9E9
| 107695 ||  || — || March 19, 2001 || Anderson Mesa || LONEOS || — || align=right | 5.4 km || 
|-id=696 bgcolor=#fefefe
| 107696 ||  || — || March 19, 2001 || Anderson Mesa || LONEOS || — || align=right | 1.7 km || 
|-id=697 bgcolor=#fefefe
| 107697 ||  || — || March 19, 2001 || Anderson Mesa || LONEOS || — || align=right | 1.9 km || 
|-id=698 bgcolor=#d6d6d6
| 107698 ||  || — || March 19, 2001 || Anderson Mesa || LONEOS || — || align=right | 5.9 km || 
|-id=699 bgcolor=#E9E9E9
| 107699 ||  || — || March 19, 2001 || Anderson Mesa || LONEOS || — || align=right | 1.6 km || 
|-id=700 bgcolor=#fefefe
| 107700 ||  || — || March 19, 2001 || Anderson Mesa || LONEOS || NYS || align=right | 1.1 km || 
|}

107701–107800 

|-bgcolor=#E9E9E9
| 107701 ||  || — || March 19, 2001 || Anderson Mesa || LONEOS || EUN || align=right | 2.7 km || 
|-id=702 bgcolor=#fefefe
| 107702 ||  || — || March 19, 2001 || Anderson Mesa || LONEOS || NYS || align=right | 1.4 km || 
|-id=703 bgcolor=#fefefe
| 107703 ||  || — || March 19, 2001 || Anderson Mesa || LONEOS || — || align=right | 2.8 km || 
|-id=704 bgcolor=#E9E9E9
| 107704 ||  || — || March 19, 2001 || Anderson Mesa || LONEOS || — || align=right | 1.8 km || 
|-id=705 bgcolor=#fefefe
| 107705 ||  || — || March 19, 2001 || Anderson Mesa || LONEOS || NYS || align=right | 1.5 km || 
|-id=706 bgcolor=#E9E9E9
| 107706 ||  || — || March 19, 2001 || Anderson Mesa || LONEOS || — || align=right | 2.9 km || 
|-id=707 bgcolor=#E9E9E9
| 107707 ||  || — || March 19, 2001 || Anderson Mesa || LONEOS || EUN || align=right | 2.4 km || 
|-id=708 bgcolor=#E9E9E9
| 107708 ||  || — || March 19, 2001 || Anderson Mesa || LONEOS || MRX || align=right | 2.1 km || 
|-id=709 bgcolor=#fefefe
| 107709 ||  || — || March 19, 2001 || Anderson Mesa || LONEOS || V || align=right | 1.3 km || 
|-id=710 bgcolor=#E9E9E9
| 107710 ||  || — || March 19, 2001 || Anderson Mesa || LONEOS || — || align=right | 2.3 km || 
|-id=711 bgcolor=#E9E9E9
| 107711 ||  || — || March 19, 2001 || Anderson Mesa || LONEOS || — || align=right | 4.8 km || 
|-id=712 bgcolor=#fefefe
| 107712 ||  || — || March 19, 2001 || Anderson Mesa || LONEOS || FLO || align=right | 1.6 km || 
|-id=713 bgcolor=#fefefe
| 107713 ||  || — || March 19, 2001 || Anderson Mesa || LONEOS || — || align=right | 2.6 km || 
|-id=714 bgcolor=#E9E9E9
| 107714 ||  || — || March 21, 2001 || Anderson Mesa || LONEOS || RAF || align=right | 1.8 km || 
|-id=715 bgcolor=#E9E9E9
| 107715 ||  || — || March 21, 2001 || Anderson Mesa || LONEOS || — || align=right | 2.5 km || 
|-id=716 bgcolor=#E9E9E9
| 107716 ||  || — || March 21, 2001 || Anderson Mesa || LONEOS || — || align=right | 5.2 km || 
|-id=717 bgcolor=#E9E9E9
| 107717 ||  || — || March 21, 2001 || Anderson Mesa || LONEOS || — || align=right | 2.4 km || 
|-id=718 bgcolor=#E9E9E9
| 107718 ||  || — || March 21, 2001 || Anderson Mesa || LONEOS || — || align=right | 2.0 km || 
|-id=719 bgcolor=#fefefe
| 107719 ||  || — || March 21, 2001 || Anderson Mesa || LONEOS || V || align=right | 1.3 km || 
|-id=720 bgcolor=#E9E9E9
| 107720 ||  || — || March 21, 2001 || Anderson Mesa || LONEOS || JUN || align=right | 4.6 km || 
|-id=721 bgcolor=#fefefe
| 107721 ||  || — || March 21, 2001 || Anderson Mesa || LONEOS || — || align=right | 1.3 km || 
|-id=722 bgcolor=#fefefe
| 107722 ||  || — || March 17, 2001 || Socorro || LINEAR || — || align=right | 2.2 km || 
|-id=723 bgcolor=#fefefe
| 107723 ||  || — || March 17, 2001 || Socorro || LINEAR || — || align=right | 2.1 km || 
|-id=724 bgcolor=#E9E9E9
| 107724 ||  || — || March 18, 2001 || Socorro || LINEAR || MIT || align=right | 4.3 km || 
|-id=725 bgcolor=#d6d6d6
| 107725 ||  || — || March 18, 2001 || Socorro || LINEAR || — || align=right | 7.7 km || 
|-id=726 bgcolor=#E9E9E9
| 107726 ||  || — || March 18, 2001 || Socorro || LINEAR || BRU || align=right | 6.3 km || 
|-id=727 bgcolor=#E9E9E9
| 107727 ||  || — || March 18, 2001 || Socorro || LINEAR || — || align=right | 4.5 km || 
|-id=728 bgcolor=#E9E9E9
| 107728 ||  || — || March 18, 2001 || Socorro || LINEAR || — || align=right | 2.0 km || 
|-id=729 bgcolor=#E9E9E9
| 107729 ||  || — || March 18, 2001 || Socorro || LINEAR || — || align=right | 1.8 km || 
|-id=730 bgcolor=#fefefe
| 107730 ||  || — || March 19, 2001 || Socorro || LINEAR || FLO || align=right | 2.0 km || 
|-id=731 bgcolor=#fefefe
| 107731 ||  || — || March 19, 2001 || Socorro || LINEAR || NYS || align=right | 1.2 km || 
|-id=732 bgcolor=#fefefe
| 107732 ||  || — || March 19, 2001 || Socorro || LINEAR || NYS || align=right | 1.6 km || 
|-id=733 bgcolor=#E9E9E9
| 107733 ||  || — || March 19, 2001 || Socorro || LINEAR || — || align=right | 4.7 km || 
|-id=734 bgcolor=#fefefe
| 107734 ||  || — || March 18, 2001 || Haleakala || NEAT || — || align=right | 3.6 km || 
|-id=735 bgcolor=#E9E9E9
| 107735 ||  || — || March 20, 2001 || Haleakala || NEAT || — || align=right | 2.6 km || 
|-id=736 bgcolor=#E9E9E9
| 107736 ||  || — || March 21, 2001 || Haleakala || NEAT || — || align=right | 2.5 km || 
|-id=737 bgcolor=#fefefe
| 107737 ||  || — || March 21, 2001 || Haleakala || NEAT || EUT || align=right | 1.1 km || 
|-id=738 bgcolor=#fefefe
| 107738 ||  || — || March 21, 2001 || Haleakala || NEAT || MAS || align=right | 1.5 km || 
|-id=739 bgcolor=#E9E9E9
| 107739 ||  || — || March 22, 2001 || Kitt Peak || Spacewatch || — || align=right | 1.7 km || 
|-id=740 bgcolor=#fefefe
| 107740 ||  || — || March 22, 2001 || Kitt Peak || Spacewatch || SUL || align=right | 2.9 km || 
|-id=741 bgcolor=#fefefe
| 107741 ||  || — || March 18, 2001 || Socorro || LINEAR || H || align=right | 1.4 km || 
|-id=742 bgcolor=#fefefe
| 107742 ||  || — || March 17, 2001 || Socorro || LINEAR || — || align=right | 3.4 km || 
|-id=743 bgcolor=#E9E9E9
| 107743 ||  || — || March 18, 2001 || Socorro || LINEAR || — || align=right | 2.0 km || 
|-id=744 bgcolor=#E9E9E9
| 107744 ||  || — || March 18, 2001 || Socorro || LINEAR || — || align=right | 2.0 km || 
|-id=745 bgcolor=#fefefe
| 107745 ||  || — || March 18, 2001 || Socorro || LINEAR || — || align=right | 1.5 km || 
|-id=746 bgcolor=#fefefe
| 107746 ||  || — || March 18, 2001 || Socorro || LINEAR || NYS || align=right | 1.4 km || 
|-id=747 bgcolor=#fefefe
| 107747 ||  || — || March 18, 2001 || Socorro || LINEAR || V || align=right | 1.4 km || 
|-id=748 bgcolor=#fefefe
| 107748 ||  || — || March 18, 2001 || Socorro || LINEAR || — || align=right | 1.8 km || 
|-id=749 bgcolor=#fefefe
| 107749 ||  || — || March 18, 2001 || Socorro || LINEAR || — || align=right | 1.7 km || 
|-id=750 bgcolor=#fefefe
| 107750 ||  || — || March 18, 2001 || Socorro || LINEAR || V || align=right | 1.5 km || 
|-id=751 bgcolor=#fefefe
| 107751 ||  || — || March 18, 2001 || Socorro || LINEAR || NYS || align=right | 1.3 km || 
|-id=752 bgcolor=#fefefe
| 107752 ||  || — || March 18, 2001 || Socorro || LINEAR || — || align=right | 1.4 km || 
|-id=753 bgcolor=#E9E9E9
| 107753 ||  || — || March 18, 2001 || Socorro || LINEAR || — || align=right | 2.0 km || 
|-id=754 bgcolor=#E9E9E9
| 107754 ||  || — || March 18, 2001 || Socorro || LINEAR || WIT || align=right | 2.1 km || 
|-id=755 bgcolor=#fefefe
| 107755 ||  || — || March 18, 2001 || Socorro || LINEAR || MAS || align=right | 1.2 km || 
|-id=756 bgcolor=#fefefe
| 107756 ||  || — || March 18, 2001 || Socorro || LINEAR || — || align=right | 1.2 km || 
|-id=757 bgcolor=#E9E9E9
| 107757 ||  || — || March 18, 2001 || Socorro || LINEAR || — || align=right | 2.3 km || 
|-id=758 bgcolor=#E9E9E9
| 107758 ||  || — || March 18, 2001 || Socorro || LINEAR || EUN || align=right | 2.3 km || 
|-id=759 bgcolor=#fefefe
| 107759 ||  || — || March 18, 2001 || Socorro || LINEAR || — || align=right | 1.8 km || 
|-id=760 bgcolor=#E9E9E9
| 107760 ||  || — || March 18, 2001 || Socorro || LINEAR || — || align=right | 2.7 km || 
|-id=761 bgcolor=#fefefe
| 107761 ||  || — || March 18, 2001 || Socorro || LINEAR || — || align=right | 1.7 km || 
|-id=762 bgcolor=#E9E9E9
| 107762 ||  || — || March 18, 2001 || Socorro || LINEAR || — || align=right | 3.5 km || 
|-id=763 bgcolor=#E9E9E9
| 107763 ||  || — || March 18, 2001 || Socorro || LINEAR || — || align=right | 3.4 km || 
|-id=764 bgcolor=#fefefe
| 107764 ||  || — || March 18, 2001 || Socorro || LINEAR || — || align=right | 3.6 km || 
|-id=765 bgcolor=#E9E9E9
| 107765 ||  || — || March 18, 2001 || Socorro || LINEAR || — || align=right | 2.9 km || 
|-id=766 bgcolor=#fefefe
| 107766 ||  || — || March 18, 2001 || Socorro || LINEAR || FLO || align=right | 1.2 km || 
|-id=767 bgcolor=#E9E9E9
| 107767 ||  || — || March 18, 2001 || Socorro || LINEAR || GEF || align=right | 2.6 km || 
|-id=768 bgcolor=#fefefe
| 107768 ||  || — || March 18, 2001 || Socorro || LINEAR || — || align=right | 1.7 km || 
|-id=769 bgcolor=#fefefe
| 107769 ||  || — || March 18, 2001 || Socorro || LINEAR || MAS || align=right | 1.6 km || 
|-id=770 bgcolor=#fefefe
| 107770 ||  || — || March 18, 2001 || Socorro || LINEAR || MAS || align=right | 1.7 km || 
|-id=771 bgcolor=#E9E9E9
| 107771 ||  || — || March 18, 2001 || Socorro || LINEAR || DOR || align=right | 4.5 km || 
|-id=772 bgcolor=#E9E9E9
| 107772 ||  || — || March 18, 2001 || Socorro || LINEAR || — || align=right | 2.0 km || 
|-id=773 bgcolor=#E9E9E9
| 107773 ||  || — || March 18, 2001 || Socorro || LINEAR || — || align=right | 2.4 km || 
|-id=774 bgcolor=#fefefe
| 107774 ||  || — || March 18, 2001 || Socorro || LINEAR || — || align=right | 1.4 km || 
|-id=775 bgcolor=#E9E9E9
| 107775 ||  || — || March 18, 2001 || Socorro || LINEAR || — || align=right | 2.4 km || 
|-id=776 bgcolor=#E9E9E9
| 107776 ||  || — || March 18, 2001 || Socorro || LINEAR || — || align=right | 3.9 km || 
|-id=777 bgcolor=#E9E9E9
| 107777 ||  || — || March 18, 2001 || Socorro || LINEAR || ADE || align=right | 5.7 km || 
|-id=778 bgcolor=#E9E9E9
| 107778 ||  || — || March 18, 2001 || Socorro || LINEAR || GER || align=right | 3.0 km || 
|-id=779 bgcolor=#fefefe
| 107779 ||  || — || March 18, 2001 || Socorro || LINEAR || — || align=right | 1.3 km || 
|-id=780 bgcolor=#E9E9E9
| 107780 ||  || — || March 18, 2001 || Socorro || LINEAR || — || align=right | 3.6 km || 
|-id=781 bgcolor=#E9E9E9
| 107781 ||  || — || March 18, 2001 || Socorro || LINEAR || AGN || align=right | 2.2 km || 
|-id=782 bgcolor=#E9E9E9
| 107782 ||  || — || March 18, 2001 || Socorro || LINEAR || EUN || align=right | 2.5 km || 
|-id=783 bgcolor=#fefefe
| 107783 ||  || — || March 18, 2001 || Socorro || LINEAR || NYS || align=right | 1.2 km || 
|-id=784 bgcolor=#E9E9E9
| 107784 ||  || — || March 18, 2001 || Socorro || LINEAR || JUN || align=right | 2.5 km || 
|-id=785 bgcolor=#fefefe
| 107785 ||  || — || March 18, 2001 || Socorro || LINEAR || — || align=right | 2.0 km || 
|-id=786 bgcolor=#d6d6d6
| 107786 ||  || — || March 18, 2001 || Socorro || LINEAR || — || align=right | 6.9 km || 
|-id=787 bgcolor=#fefefe
| 107787 ||  || — || March 18, 2001 || Socorro || LINEAR || FLO || align=right | 1.5 km || 
|-id=788 bgcolor=#E9E9E9
| 107788 ||  || — || March 18, 2001 || Socorro || LINEAR || RAF || align=right | 2.0 km || 
|-id=789 bgcolor=#fefefe
| 107789 ||  || — || March 18, 2001 || Socorro || LINEAR || FLO || align=right | 1.5 km || 
|-id=790 bgcolor=#fefefe
| 107790 ||  || — || March 18, 2001 || Socorro || LINEAR || — || align=right | 1.4 km || 
|-id=791 bgcolor=#fefefe
| 107791 ||  || — || March 18, 2001 || Socorro || LINEAR || FLO || align=right | 2.1 km || 
|-id=792 bgcolor=#E9E9E9
| 107792 ||  || — || March 18, 2001 || Socorro || LINEAR || — || align=right | 4.2 km || 
|-id=793 bgcolor=#E9E9E9
| 107793 ||  || — || March 18, 2001 || Socorro || LINEAR || — || align=right | 4.3 km || 
|-id=794 bgcolor=#fefefe
| 107794 ||  || — || March 18, 2001 || Socorro || LINEAR || PHO || align=right | 1.9 km || 
|-id=795 bgcolor=#E9E9E9
| 107795 ||  || — || March 18, 2001 || Socorro || LINEAR || MIT || align=right | 4.7 km || 
|-id=796 bgcolor=#E9E9E9
| 107796 ||  || — || March 18, 2001 || Socorro || LINEAR || — || align=right | 2.3 km || 
|-id=797 bgcolor=#E9E9E9
| 107797 ||  || — || March 21, 2001 || Socorro || LINEAR || — || align=right | 4.6 km || 
|-id=798 bgcolor=#fefefe
| 107798 ||  || — || March 23, 2001 || Socorro || LINEAR || FLO || align=right | 1.4 km || 
|-id=799 bgcolor=#fefefe
| 107799 ||  || — || March 23, 2001 || Socorro || LINEAR || V || align=right | 1.4 km || 
|-id=800 bgcolor=#E9E9E9
| 107800 ||  || — || March 23, 2001 || Anderson Mesa || LONEOS || — || align=right | 3.6 km || 
|}

107801–107900 

|-bgcolor=#fefefe
| 107801 ||  || — || March 18, 2001 || Socorro || LINEAR || FLO || align=right | 1.5 km || 
|-id=802 bgcolor=#fefefe
| 107802 ||  || — || March 24, 2001 || Haleakala || NEAT || PHO || align=right | 3.2 km || 
|-id=803 bgcolor=#E9E9E9
| 107803 ||  || — || March 26, 2001 || Cordell-Lorenz || D. T. Durig || — || align=right | 1.7 km || 
|-id=804 bgcolor=#C2FFFF
| 107804 ||  || — || March 26, 2001 || Kitt Peak || Spacewatch || L4 || align=right | 18 km || 
|-id=805 bgcolor=#fefefe
| 107805 Saibi ||  ||  || March 21, 2001 || Kuma Kogen || A. Nakamura || — || align=right | 1.4 km || 
|-id=806 bgcolor=#E9E9E9
| 107806 ||  || — || March 26, 2001 || Kanab || E. E. Sheridan || — || align=right | 2.0 km || 
|-id=807 bgcolor=#fefefe
| 107807 ||  || — || March 19, 2001 || Socorro || LINEAR || — || align=right | 1.4 km || 
|-id=808 bgcolor=#fefefe
| 107808 ||  || — || March 19, 2001 || Socorro || LINEAR || FLO || align=right | 1.2 km || 
|-id=809 bgcolor=#fefefe
| 107809 ||  || — || March 19, 2001 || Socorro || LINEAR || NYS || align=right | 1.5 km || 
|-id=810 bgcolor=#fefefe
| 107810 ||  || — || March 19, 2001 || Socorro || LINEAR || FLO || align=right | 1.4 km || 
|-id=811 bgcolor=#fefefe
| 107811 ||  || — || March 19, 2001 || Socorro || LINEAR || V || align=right | 1.2 km || 
|-id=812 bgcolor=#E9E9E9
| 107812 ||  || — || March 19, 2001 || Socorro || LINEAR || ADE || align=right | 7.3 km || 
|-id=813 bgcolor=#fefefe
| 107813 ||  || — || March 19, 2001 || Socorro || LINEAR || — || align=right | 2.0 km || 
|-id=814 bgcolor=#fefefe
| 107814 ||  || — || March 19, 2001 || Socorro || LINEAR || — || align=right | 1.6 km || 
|-id=815 bgcolor=#E9E9E9
| 107815 ||  || — || March 19, 2001 || Socorro || LINEAR || — || align=right | 2.5 km || 
|-id=816 bgcolor=#E9E9E9
| 107816 ||  || — || March 19, 2001 || Socorro || LINEAR || — || align=right | 2.4 km || 
|-id=817 bgcolor=#fefefe
| 107817 ||  || — || March 19, 2001 || Socorro || LINEAR || — || align=right | 2.3 km || 
|-id=818 bgcolor=#E9E9E9
| 107818 ||  || — || March 19, 2001 || Socorro || LINEAR || — || align=right | 5.1 km || 
|-id=819 bgcolor=#fefefe
| 107819 ||  || — || March 19, 2001 || Socorro || LINEAR || — || align=right | 1.3 km || 
|-id=820 bgcolor=#fefefe
| 107820 ||  || — || March 19, 2001 || Socorro || LINEAR || V || align=right | 1.2 km || 
|-id=821 bgcolor=#fefefe
| 107821 ||  || — || March 19, 2001 || Socorro || LINEAR || MAS || align=right | 1.3 km || 
|-id=822 bgcolor=#fefefe
| 107822 ||  || — || March 19, 2001 || Socorro || LINEAR || MAS || align=right | 1.4 km || 
|-id=823 bgcolor=#E9E9E9
| 107823 ||  || — || March 19, 2001 || Socorro || LINEAR || MIT || align=right | 4.8 km || 
|-id=824 bgcolor=#fefefe
| 107824 ||  || — || March 19, 2001 || Socorro || LINEAR || — || align=right | 1.3 km || 
|-id=825 bgcolor=#E9E9E9
| 107825 ||  || — || March 19, 2001 || Socorro || LINEAR || — || align=right | 5.1 km || 
|-id=826 bgcolor=#E9E9E9
| 107826 ||  || — || March 19, 2001 || Socorro || LINEAR || — || align=right | 2.3 km || 
|-id=827 bgcolor=#fefefe
| 107827 ||  || — || March 19, 2001 || Socorro || LINEAR || NYS || align=right | 1.3 km || 
|-id=828 bgcolor=#fefefe
| 107828 ||  || — || March 19, 2001 || Socorro || LINEAR || — || align=right | 1.5 km || 
|-id=829 bgcolor=#E9E9E9
| 107829 ||  || — || March 19, 2001 || Socorro || LINEAR || — || align=right | 2.0 km || 
|-id=830 bgcolor=#fefefe
| 107830 ||  || — || March 19, 2001 || Socorro || LINEAR || — || align=right | 2.2 km || 
|-id=831 bgcolor=#fefefe
| 107831 ||  || — || March 19, 2001 || Socorro || LINEAR || ERI || align=right | 3.9 km || 
|-id=832 bgcolor=#E9E9E9
| 107832 ||  || — || March 19, 2001 || Socorro || LINEAR || EUN || align=right | 2.4 km || 
|-id=833 bgcolor=#fefefe
| 107833 ||  || — || March 19, 2001 || Socorro || LINEAR || MAS || align=right | 1.5 km || 
|-id=834 bgcolor=#E9E9E9
| 107834 ||  || — || March 19, 2001 || Socorro || LINEAR || EUN || align=right | 2.2 km || 
|-id=835 bgcolor=#E9E9E9
| 107835 ||  || — || March 19, 2001 || Socorro || LINEAR || — || align=right | 2.1 km || 
|-id=836 bgcolor=#E9E9E9
| 107836 ||  || — || March 19, 2001 || Socorro || LINEAR || — || align=right | 3.1 km || 
|-id=837 bgcolor=#fefefe
| 107837 ||  || — || March 19, 2001 || Socorro || LINEAR || FLO || align=right | 1.1 km || 
|-id=838 bgcolor=#fefefe
| 107838 ||  || — || March 19, 2001 || Socorro || LINEAR || — || align=right | 1.8 km || 
|-id=839 bgcolor=#fefefe
| 107839 ||  || — || March 19, 2001 || Socorro || LINEAR || ERI || align=right | 2.4 km || 
|-id=840 bgcolor=#fefefe
| 107840 ||  || — || March 19, 2001 || Socorro || LINEAR || — || align=right | 1.7 km || 
|-id=841 bgcolor=#fefefe
| 107841 ||  || — || March 19, 2001 || Socorro || LINEAR || FLO || align=right | 1.1 km || 
|-id=842 bgcolor=#fefefe
| 107842 ||  || — || March 19, 2001 || Socorro || LINEAR || FLO || align=right | 1.3 km || 
|-id=843 bgcolor=#E9E9E9
| 107843 ||  || — || March 19, 2001 || Socorro || LINEAR || — || align=right | 4.4 km || 
|-id=844 bgcolor=#E9E9E9
| 107844 ||  || — || March 19, 2001 || Socorro || LINEAR || — || align=right | 6.7 km || 
|-id=845 bgcolor=#fefefe
| 107845 ||  || — || March 19, 2001 || Socorro || LINEAR || NYS || align=right | 1.3 km || 
|-id=846 bgcolor=#fefefe
| 107846 ||  || — || March 19, 2001 || Socorro || LINEAR || — || align=right | 1.7 km || 
|-id=847 bgcolor=#E9E9E9
| 107847 ||  || — || March 19, 2001 || Socorro || LINEAR || — || align=right | 1.9 km || 
|-id=848 bgcolor=#E9E9E9
| 107848 ||  || — || March 19, 2001 || Socorro || LINEAR || ADE || align=right | 4.1 km || 
|-id=849 bgcolor=#E9E9E9
| 107849 ||  || — || March 19, 2001 || Socorro || LINEAR || — || align=right | 2.2 km || 
|-id=850 bgcolor=#fefefe
| 107850 ||  || — || March 19, 2001 || Socorro || LINEAR || — || align=right | 1.6 km || 
|-id=851 bgcolor=#E9E9E9
| 107851 ||  || — || March 19, 2001 || Socorro || LINEAR || — || align=right | 3.3 km || 
|-id=852 bgcolor=#E9E9E9
| 107852 ||  || — || March 19, 2001 || Socorro || LINEAR || — || align=right | 2.2 km || 
|-id=853 bgcolor=#fefefe
| 107853 ||  || — || March 19, 2001 || Socorro || LINEAR || NYS || align=right | 1.6 km || 
|-id=854 bgcolor=#E9E9E9
| 107854 ||  || — || March 19, 2001 || Socorro || LINEAR || MAR || align=right | 3.0 km || 
|-id=855 bgcolor=#fefefe
| 107855 ||  || — || March 19, 2001 || Socorro || LINEAR || FLOslow || align=right | 1.6 km || 
|-id=856 bgcolor=#fefefe
| 107856 ||  || — || March 19, 2001 || Socorro || LINEAR || FLO || align=right | 1.4 km || 
|-id=857 bgcolor=#E9E9E9
| 107857 ||  || — || March 19, 2001 || Socorro || LINEAR || — || align=right | 2.1 km || 
|-id=858 bgcolor=#E9E9E9
| 107858 ||  || — || March 19, 2001 || Socorro || LINEAR || — || align=right | 3.5 km || 
|-id=859 bgcolor=#E9E9E9
| 107859 ||  || — || March 19, 2001 || Socorro || LINEAR || — || align=right | 3.1 km || 
|-id=860 bgcolor=#fefefe
| 107860 ||  || — || March 21, 2001 || Socorro || LINEAR || — || align=right | 3.0 km || 
|-id=861 bgcolor=#d6d6d6
| 107861 ||  || — || March 21, 2001 || Socorro || LINEAR || LIX || align=right | 9.6 km || 
|-id=862 bgcolor=#d6d6d6
| 107862 ||  || — || March 21, 2001 || Socorro || LINEAR || EUP || align=right | 7.1 km || 
|-id=863 bgcolor=#E9E9E9
| 107863 ||  || — || March 21, 2001 || Socorro || LINEAR || JUN || align=right | 2.8 km || 
|-id=864 bgcolor=#fefefe
| 107864 ||  || — || March 21, 2001 || Socorro || LINEAR || — || align=right | 2.8 km || 
|-id=865 bgcolor=#E9E9E9
| 107865 ||  || — || March 23, 2001 || Socorro || LINEAR || — || align=right | 3.8 km || 
|-id=866 bgcolor=#fefefe
| 107866 ||  || — || March 26, 2001 || Kitt Peak || Spacewatch || — || align=right | 1.4 km || 
|-id=867 bgcolor=#d6d6d6
| 107867 ||  || — || March 26, 2001 || Kitt Peak || Spacewatch || — || align=right | 3.7 km || 
|-id=868 bgcolor=#fefefe
| 107868 ||  || — || March 26, 2001 || Cerro Tololo || DLS || NYS || align=right | 1.5 km || 
|-id=869 bgcolor=#fefefe
| 107869 ||  || — || March 27, 2001 || Desert Beaver || W. K. Y. Yeung || FLO || align=right | 1.3 km || 
|-id=870 bgcolor=#E9E9E9
| 107870 ||  || — || March 21, 2001 || Anderson Mesa || LONEOS || — || align=right | 1.9 km || 
|-id=871 bgcolor=#E9E9E9
| 107871 ||  || — || March 21, 2001 || Anderson Mesa || LONEOS || — || align=right | 2.0 km || 
|-id=872 bgcolor=#fefefe
| 107872 ||  || — || March 21, 2001 || Anderson Mesa || LONEOS || — || align=right | 1.3 km || 
|-id=873 bgcolor=#fefefe
| 107873 ||  || — || March 21, 2001 || Anderson Mesa || LONEOS || NYS || align=right | 1.3 km || 
|-id=874 bgcolor=#d6d6d6
| 107874 ||  || — || March 21, 2001 || Anderson Mesa || LONEOS || — || align=right | 6.7 km || 
|-id=875 bgcolor=#d6d6d6
| 107875 ||  || — || March 27, 2001 || Anderson Mesa || LONEOS || — || align=right | 6.8 km || 
|-id=876 bgcolor=#E9E9E9
| 107876 ||  || — || March 26, 2001 || Kitt Peak || Spacewatch || — || align=right | 2.2 km || 
|-id=877 bgcolor=#fefefe
| 107877 ||  || — || March 27, 2001 || Kitt Peak || Spacewatch || NYS || align=right | 1.6 km || 
|-id=878 bgcolor=#E9E9E9
| 107878 ||  || — || March 27, 2001 || Kitt Peak || Spacewatch || — || align=right | 2.6 km || 
|-id=879 bgcolor=#d6d6d6
| 107879 ||  || — || March 27, 2001 || Kitt Peak || Spacewatch || THM || align=right | 5.4 km || 
|-id=880 bgcolor=#fefefe
| 107880 ||  || — || March 27, 2001 || Kitt Peak || Spacewatch || — || align=right | 1.4 km || 
|-id=881 bgcolor=#fefefe
| 107881 ||  || — || March 26, 2001 || Socorro || LINEAR || NYS || align=right | 1.8 km || 
|-id=882 bgcolor=#E9E9E9
| 107882 ||  || — || March 26, 2001 || Socorro || LINEAR || — || align=right | 3.4 km || 
|-id=883 bgcolor=#fefefe
| 107883 ||  || — || March 27, 2001 || Haleakala || NEAT || — || align=right | 1.5 km || 
|-id=884 bgcolor=#fefefe
| 107884 ||  || — || March 27, 2001 || Haleakala || NEAT || — || align=right | 1.7 km || 
|-id=885 bgcolor=#E9E9E9
| 107885 ||  || — || March 16, 2001 || Socorro || LINEAR || NEM || align=right | 3.5 km || 
|-id=886 bgcolor=#d6d6d6
| 107886 ||  || — || March 16, 2001 || Socorro || LINEAR || — || align=right | 5.2 km || 
|-id=887 bgcolor=#fefefe
| 107887 ||  || — || March 16, 2001 || Socorro || LINEAR || — || align=right | 2.7 km || 
|-id=888 bgcolor=#FA8072
| 107888 ||  || — || March 16, 2001 || Socorro || LINEAR || — || align=right | 1.7 km || 
|-id=889 bgcolor=#fefefe
| 107889 ||  || — || March 16, 2001 || Socorro || LINEAR || FLO || align=right | 1.5 km || 
|-id=890 bgcolor=#fefefe
| 107890 ||  || — || March 16, 2001 || Socorro || LINEAR || V || align=right | 1.3 km || 
|-id=891 bgcolor=#fefefe
| 107891 ||  || — || March 16, 2001 || Socorro || LINEAR || — || align=right | 1.6 km || 
|-id=892 bgcolor=#fefefe
| 107892 ||  || — || March 16, 2001 || Socorro || LINEAR || — || align=right | 1.8 km || 
|-id=893 bgcolor=#d6d6d6
| 107893 ||  || — || March 16, 2001 || Socorro || LINEAR || EOS || align=right | 4.4 km || 
|-id=894 bgcolor=#E9E9E9
| 107894 ||  || — || March 16, 2001 || Socorro || LINEAR || — || align=right | 2.7 km || 
|-id=895 bgcolor=#E9E9E9
| 107895 ||  || — || March 16, 2001 || Socorro || LINEAR || — || align=right | 2.3 km || 
|-id=896 bgcolor=#E9E9E9
| 107896 ||  || — || March 16, 2001 || Socorro || LINEAR || — || align=right | 2.4 km || 
|-id=897 bgcolor=#fefefe
| 107897 ||  || — || March 16, 2001 || Socorro || LINEAR || — || align=right | 1.7 km || 
|-id=898 bgcolor=#d6d6d6
| 107898 ||  || — || March 16, 2001 || Socorro || LINEAR || — || align=right | 3.7 km || 
|-id=899 bgcolor=#fefefe
| 107899 ||  || — || March 16, 2001 || Socorro || LINEAR || FLO || align=right | 1.5 km || 
|-id=900 bgcolor=#d6d6d6
| 107900 ||  || — || March 16, 2001 || Socorro || LINEAR || — || align=right | 5.3 km || 
|}

107901–108000 

|-bgcolor=#E9E9E9
| 107901 ||  || — || March 16, 2001 || Socorro || LINEAR || — || align=right | 2.9 km || 
|-id=902 bgcolor=#fefefe
| 107902 ||  || — || March 16, 2001 || Socorro || LINEAR || — || align=right | 1.9 km || 
|-id=903 bgcolor=#E9E9E9
| 107903 ||  || — || March 16, 2001 || Socorro || LINEAR || MAR || align=right | 2.4 km || 
|-id=904 bgcolor=#fefefe
| 107904 ||  || — || March 16, 2001 || Socorro || LINEAR || FLO || align=right | 1.2 km || 
|-id=905 bgcolor=#E9E9E9
| 107905 ||  || — || March 16, 2001 || Socorro || LINEAR || BRU || align=right | 4.6 km || 
|-id=906 bgcolor=#E9E9E9
| 107906 ||  || — || March 16, 2001 || Socorro || LINEAR || MAR || align=right | 3.5 km || 
|-id=907 bgcolor=#fefefe
| 107907 ||  || — || March 16, 2001 || Socorro || LINEAR || — || align=right | 2.3 km || 
|-id=908 bgcolor=#E9E9E9
| 107908 ||  || — || March 16, 2001 || Socorro || LINEAR || — || align=right | 2.4 km || 
|-id=909 bgcolor=#E9E9E9
| 107909 ||  || — || March 16, 2001 || Socorro || LINEAR || — || align=right | 1.9 km || 
|-id=910 bgcolor=#E9E9E9
| 107910 ||  || — || March 16, 2001 || Socorro || LINEAR || — || align=right | 5.5 km || 
|-id=911 bgcolor=#fefefe
| 107911 ||  || — || March 16, 2001 || Haleakala || NEAT || — || align=right | 1.8 km || 
|-id=912 bgcolor=#fefefe
| 107912 ||  || — || March 16, 2001 || Kitt Peak || Spacewatch || — || align=right | 1.5 km || 
|-id=913 bgcolor=#E9E9E9
| 107913 ||  || — || March 17, 2001 || Socorro || LINEAR || — || align=right | 2.2 km || 
|-id=914 bgcolor=#E9E9E9
| 107914 ||  || — || March 17, 2001 || Kitt Peak || Spacewatch || EUN || align=right | 1.9 km || 
|-id=915 bgcolor=#d6d6d6
| 107915 ||  || — || March 17, 2001 || Socorro || LINEAR || — || align=right | 5.6 km || 
|-id=916 bgcolor=#E9E9E9
| 107916 ||  || — || March 17, 2001 || Socorro || LINEAR || MAR || align=right | 2.0 km || 
|-id=917 bgcolor=#E9E9E9
| 107917 ||  || — || March 17, 2001 || Socorro || LINEAR || — || align=right | 2.9 km || 
|-id=918 bgcolor=#d6d6d6
| 107918 ||  || — || March 17, 2001 || Socorro || LINEAR || — || align=right | 3.8 km || 
|-id=919 bgcolor=#d6d6d6
| 107919 ||  || — || March 17, 2001 || Socorro || LINEAR || — || align=right | 6.4 km || 
|-id=920 bgcolor=#fefefe
| 107920 ||  || — || March 18, 2001 || Socorro || LINEAR || — || align=right | 1.7 km || 
|-id=921 bgcolor=#fefefe
| 107921 ||  || — || March 18, 2001 || Socorro || LINEAR || — || align=right | 1.3 km || 
|-id=922 bgcolor=#E9E9E9
| 107922 ||  || — || March 18, 2001 || Socorro || LINEAR || — || align=right | 3.9 km || 
|-id=923 bgcolor=#fefefe
| 107923 ||  || — || March 18, 2001 || Socorro || LINEAR || V || align=right | 1.3 km || 
|-id=924 bgcolor=#fefefe
| 107924 ||  || — || March 18, 2001 || Socorro || LINEAR || NYS || align=right | 1.4 km || 
|-id=925 bgcolor=#fefefe
| 107925 ||  || — || March 18, 2001 || Socorro || LINEAR || — || align=right | 1.6 km || 
|-id=926 bgcolor=#fefefe
| 107926 ||  || — || March 18, 2001 || Socorro || LINEAR || V || align=right | 1.1 km || 
|-id=927 bgcolor=#fefefe
| 107927 ||  || — || March 18, 2001 || Socorro || LINEAR || — || align=right | 1.6 km || 
|-id=928 bgcolor=#E9E9E9
| 107928 ||  || — || March 18, 2001 || Socorro || LINEAR || — || align=right | 2.0 km || 
|-id=929 bgcolor=#E9E9E9
| 107929 ||  || — || March 18, 2001 || Anderson Mesa || LONEOS || — || align=right | 1.2 km || 
|-id=930 bgcolor=#fefefe
| 107930 ||  || — || March 18, 2001 || Socorro || LINEAR || MAS || align=right data-sort-value="0.92" | 920 m || 
|-id=931 bgcolor=#fefefe
| 107931 ||  || — || March 18, 2001 || Socorro || LINEAR || — || align=right | 2.0 km || 
|-id=932 bgcolor=#E9E9E9
| 107932 ||  || — || March 18, 2001 || Socorro || LINEAR || NEM || align=right | 4.1 km || 
|-id=933 bgcolor=#E9E9E9
| 107933 ||  || — || March 18, 2001 || Socorro || LINEAR || — || align=right | 5.6 km || 
|-id=934 bgcolor=#E9E9E9
| 107934 ||  || — || March 18, 2001 || Socorro || LINEAR || — || align=right | 1.5 km || 
|-id=935 bgcolor=#d6d6d6
| 107935 ||  || — || March 18, 2001 || Socorro || LINEAR || HYG || align=right | 5.1 km || 
|-id=936 bgcolor=#E9E9E9
| 107936 ||  || — || March 18, 2001 || Kitt Peak || Spacewatch || — || align=right | 2.7 km || 
|-id=937 bgcolor=#E9E9E9
| 107937 ||  || — || March 19, 2001 || Socorro || LINEAR || — || align=right | 2.1 km || 
|-id=938 bgcolor=#E9E9E9
| 107938 ||  || — || March 19, 2001 || Anderson Mesa || LONEOS || — || align=right | 1.6 km || 
|-id=939 bgcolor=#fefefe
| 107939 ||  || — || March 19, 2001 || Anderson Mesa || LONEOS || NYS || align=right | 1.4 km || 
|-id=940 bgcolor=#fefefe
| 107940 ||  || — || March 19, 2001 || Anderson Mesa || LONEOS || — || align=right | 1.6 km || 
|-id=941 bgcolor=#fefefe
| 107941 ||  || — || March 19, 2001 || Anderson Mesa || LONEOS || — || align=right | 1.8 km || 
|-id=942 bgcolor=#E9E9E9
| 107942 ||  || — || March 19, 2001 || Anderson Mesa || LONEOS || HOF || align=right | 5.7 km || 
|-id=943 bgcolor=#fefefe
| 107943 ||  || — || March 19, 2001 || Socorro || LINEAR || — || align=right | 2.1 km || 
|-id=944 bgcolor=#E9E9E9
| 107944 ||  || — || March 19, 2001 || Anderson Mesa || LONEOS || — || align=right | 2.3 km || 
|-id=945 bgcolor=#E9E9E9
| 107945 ||  || — || March 19, 2001 || Kitt Peak || Spacewatch || — || align=right | 1.7 km || 
|-id=946 bgcolor=#E9E9E9
| 107946 ||  || — || March 19, 2001 || Kitt Peak || Spacewatch || ADE || align=right | 5.3 km || 
|-id=947 bgcolor=#fefefe
| 107947 ||  || — || March 19, 2001 || Socorro || LINEAR || FLO || align=right | 1.2 km || 
|-id=948 bgcolor=#fefefe
| 107948 ||  || — || March 19, 2001 || Socorro || LINEAR || NYS || align=right | 1.3 km || 
|-id=949 bgcolor=#fefefe
| 107949 ||  || — || March 20, 2001 || Haleakala || NEAT || — || align=right | 1.4 km || 
|-id=950 bgcolor=#d6d6d6
| 107950 ||  || — || March 28, 2001 || Kitt Peak || Spacewatch || KOR || align=right | 1.7 km || 
|-id=951 bgcolor=#E9E9E9
| 107951 ||  || — || March 26, 2001 || Socorro || LINEAR || — || align=right | 3.2 km || 
|-id=952 bgcolor=#E9E9E9
| 107952 ||  || — || March 26, 2001 || Socorro || LINEAR || — || align=right | 2.0 km || 
|-id=953 bgcolor=#E9E9E9
| 107953 ||  || — || March 26, 2001 || Socorro || LINEAR || EUN || align=right | 2.4 km || 
|-id=954 bgcolor=#fefefe
| 107954 ||  || — || March 26, 2001 || Socorro || LINEAR || — || align=right | 2.2 km || 
|-id=955 bgcolor=#E9E9E9
| 107955 ||  || — || March 26, 2001 || Socorro || LINEAR || — || align=right | 3.3 km || 
|-id=956 bgcolor=#fefefe
| 107956 ||  || — || March 23, 2001 || Anderson Mesa || LONEOS || — || align=right | 1.8 km || 
|-id=957 bgcolor=#fefefe
| 107957 ||  || — || March 23, 2001 || Anderson Mesa || LONEOS || V || align=right | 1.3 km || 
|-id=958 bgcolor=#E9E9E9
| 107958 ||  || — || March 23, 2001 || Anderson Mesa || LONEOS || AGN || align=right | 2.4 km || 
|-id=959 bgcolor=#E9E9E9
| 107959 ||  || — || March 23, 2001 || Anderson Mesa || LONEOS || — || align=right | 1.7 km || 
|-id=960 bgcolor=#fefefe
| 107960 ||  || — || March 23, 2001 || Anderson Mesa || LONEOS || NYS || align=right | 1.2 km || 
|-id=961 bgcolor=#E9E9E9
| 107961 ||  || — || March 23, 2001 || Anderson Mesa || LONEOS || — || align=right | 4.2 km || 
|-id=962 bgcolor=#E9E9E9
| 107962 ||  || — || March 23, 2001 || Anderson Mesa || LONEOS || — || align=right | 4.7 km || 
|-id=963 bgcolor=#E9E9E9
| 107963 ||  || — || March 23, 2001 || Anderson Mesa || LONEOS || — || align=right | 3.3 km || 
|-id=964 bgcolor=#fefefe
| 107964 ||  || — || March 29, 2001 || Anderson Mesa || LONEOS || — || align=right | 1.5 km || 
|-id=965 bgcolor=#fefefe
| 107965 ||  || — || March 29, 2001 || Anderson Mesa || LONEOS || — || align=right | 1.7 km || 
|-id=966 bgcolor=#E9E9E9
| 107966 ||  || — || March 29, 2001 || Anderson Mesa || LONEOS || — || align=right | 2.0 km || 
|-id=967 bgcolor=#E9E9E9
| 107967 ||  || — || March 29, 2001 || Anderson Mesa || LONEOS || VIB || align=right | 3.5 km || 
|-id=968 bgcolor=#E9E9E9
| 107968 ||  || — || March 24, 2001 || Kitt Peak || Spacewatch || — || align=right | 3.1 km || 
|-id=969 bgcolor=#E9E9E9
| 107969 ||  || — || March 24, 2001 || Kitt Peak || Spacewatch || HEN || align=right | 1.9 km || 
|-id=970 bgcolor=#E9E9E9
| 107970 ||  || — || March 26, 2001 || Socorro || LINEAR || HNS || align=right | 2.6 km || 
|-id=971 bgcolor=#E9E9E9
| 107971 ||  || — || March 29, 2001 || Socorro || LINEAR || — || align=right | 3.1 km || 
|-id=972 bgcolor=#d6d6d6
| 107972 ||  || — || March 24, 2001 || Haleakala || NEAT || — || align=right | 5.6 km || 
|-id=973 bgcolor=#fefefe
| 107973 ||  || — || March 29, 2001 || Socorro || LINEAR || — || align=right | 5.5 km || 
|-id=974 bgcolor=#E9E9E9
| 107974 ||  || — || March 26, 2001 || Socorro || LINEAR || — || align=right | 2.2 km || 
|-id=975 bgcolor=#fefefe
| 107975 ||  || — || March 26, 2001 || Socorro || LINEAR || — || align=right | 2.8 km || 
|-id=976 bgcolor=#fefefe
| 107976 ||  || — || March 29, 2001 || Socorro || LINEAR || — || align=right | 1.7 km || 
|-id=977 bgcolor=#E9E9E9
| 107977 ||  || — || March 29, 2001 || Socorro || LINEAR || — || align=right | 2.0 km || 
|-id=978 bgcolor=#d6d6d6
| 107978 ||  || — || March 29, 2001 || Socorro || LINEAR || — || align=right | 6.5 km || 
|-id=979 bgcolor=#E9E9E9
| 107979 ||  || — || March 31, 2001 || Desert Beaver || W. K. Y. Yeung || — || align=right | 2.0 km || 
|-id=980 bgcolor=#E9E9E9
| 107980 ||  || — || March 20, 2001 || Haleakala || NEAT || — || align=right | 1.8 km || 
|-id=981 bgcolor=#E9E9E9
| 107981 ||  || — || March 20, 2001 || Haleakala || NEAT || — || align=right | 4.6 km || 
|-id=982 bgcolor=#d6d6d6
| 107982 ||  || — || March 20, 2001 || Haleakala || NEAT || — || align=right | 6.5 km || 
|-id=983 bgcolor=#E9E9E9
| 107983 ||  || — || March 20, 2001 || Kitt Peak || Spacewatch || — || align=right | 2.1 km || 
|-id=984 bgcolor=#fefefe
| 107984 ||  || — || March 20, 2001 || Haleakala || NEAT || FLO || align=right | 1.1 km || 
|-id=985 bgcolor=#E9E9E9
| 107985 ||  || — || March 20, 2001 || Haleakala || NEAT || JUN || align=right | 1.5 km || 
|-id=986 bgcolor=#fefefe
| 107986 ||  || — || March 20, 2001 || Haleakala || NEAT || — || align=right | 1.5 km || 
|-id=987 bgcolor=#E9E9E9
| 107987 ||  || — || March 20, 2001 || Haleakala || NEAT || — || align=right | 1.8 km || 
|-id=988 bgcolor=#E9E9E9
| 107988 ||  || — || March 20, 2001 || Haleakala || NEAT || — || align=right | 1.9 km || 
|-id=989 bgcolor=#fefefe
| 107989 ||  || — || March 21, 2001 || Anderson Mesa || LONEOS || — || align=right | 1.7 km || 
|-id=990 bgcolor=#fefefe
| 107990 ||  || — || March 21, 2001 || Socorro || LINEAR || H || align=right | 1.3 km || 
|-id=991 bgcolor=#E9E9E9
| 107991 ||  || — || March 21, 2001 || Anderson Mesa || LONEOS || — || align=right | 2.0 km || 
|-id=992 bgcolor=#E9E9E9
| 107992 ||  || — || March 21, 2001 || Anderson Mesa || LONEOS || — || align=right | 5.2 km || 
|-id=993 bgcolor=#E9E9E9
| 107993 ||  || — || March 21, 2001 || Anderson Mesa || LONEOS || — || align=right | 2.7 km || 
|-id=994 bgcolor=#E9E9E9
| 107994 ||  || — || March 21, 2001 || Anderson Mesa || LONEOS || EUN || align=right | 2.3 km || 
|-id=995 bgcolor=#fefefe
| 107995 ||  || — || March 21, 2001 || Haleakala || NEAT || FLO || align=right | 1.3 km || 
|-id=996 bgcolor=#d6d6d6
| 107996 ||  || — || March 21, 2001 || Anderson Mesa || LONEOS || — || align=right | 5.3 km || 
|-id=997 bgcolor=#fefefe
| 107997 ||  || — || March 21, 2001 || Anderson Mesa || LONEOS || — || align=right | 3.7 km || 
|-id=998 bgcolor=#fefefe
| 107998 ||  || — || March 21, 2001 || Haleakala || NEAT || — || align=right | 2.1 km || 
|-id=999 bgcolor=#E9E9E9
| 107999 ||  || — || March 21, 2001 || Anderson Mesa || LONEOS || — || align=right | 2.2 km || 
|-id=000 bgcolor=#fefefe
| 108000 ||  || — || March 21, 2001 || Anderson Mesa || LONEOS || — || align=right | 1.9 km || 
|}

References

External links 
 Discovery Circumstances: Numbered Minor Planets (105001)–(110000) (IAU Minor Planet Center)

0107